

540001–540100 

|-bgcolor=#fefefe
| 540001 ||  || — || October 19, 2011 || Kitt Peak || Spacewatch ||  || align=right data-sort-value="0.99" | 990 m || 
|-id=002 bgcolor=#fefefe
| 540002 ||  || — || June 27, 2014 || Haleakala || Pan-STARRS ||  || align=right data-sort-value="0.59" | 590 m || 
|-id=003 bgcolor=#E9E9E9
| 540003 ||  || — || October 13, 2010 || Mount Lemmon || Mount Lemmon Survey ||  || align=right | 1.7 km || 
|-id=004 bgcolor=#d6d6d6
| 540004 ||  || — || February 5, 2016 || Haleakala || Pan-STARRS ||  || align=right | 2.8 km || 
|-id=005 bgcolor=#fefefe
| 540005 ||  || — || August 20, 2014 || Haleakala || Pan-STARRS ||  || align=right data-sort-value="0.71" | 710 m || 
|-id=006 bgcolor=#E9E9E9
| 540006 ||  || — || May 11, 2003 || Kitt Peak || Spacewatch ||  || align=right | 2.0 km || 
|-id=007 bgcolor=#E9E9E9
| 540007 ||  || — || May 9, 2000 || Socorro || LINEAR ||  || align=right | 1.9 km || 
|-id=008 bgcolor=#d6d6d6
| 540008 ||  || — || October 5, 2013 || Kitt Peak || Spacewatch ||  || align=right | 2.7 km || 
|-id=009 bgcolor=#fefefe
| 540009 ||  || — || December 7, 2010 || Mount Lemmon || Mount Lemmon Survey || H || align=right data-sort-value="0.48" | 480 m || 
|-id=010 bgcolor=#fefefe
| 540010 ||  || — || August 10, 2004 || Siding Spring || SSS || H || align=right data-sort-value="0.71" | 710 m || 
|-id=011 bgcolor=#E9E9E9
| 540011 ||  || — || May 16, 2013 || Haleakala || Pan-STARRS ||  || align=right data-sort-value="0.95" | 950 m || 
|-id=012 bgcolor=#E9E9E9
| 540012 ||  || — || August 16, 2009 || Catalina || CSS ||  || align=right | 1.2 km || 
|-id=013 bgcolor=#fefefe
| 540013 ||  || — || March 8, 2013 || Haleakala || Pan-STARRS ||  || align=right data-sort-value="0.90" | 900 m || 
|-id=014 bgcolor=#E9E9E9
| 540014 ||  || — || December 31, 2007 || Mount Lemmon || Mount Lemmon Survey ||  || align=right | 1.0 km || 
|-id=015 bgcolor=#fefefe
| 540015 ||  || — || September 14, 2007 || Siding Spring || SSS || H || align=right data-sort-value="0.64" | 640 m || 
|-id=016 bgcolor=#fefefe
| 540016 ||  || — || January 6, 1998 || Kitt Peak || Spacewatch || H || align=right data-sort-value="0.58" | 580 m || 
|-id=017 bgcolor=#fefefe
| 540017 ||  || — || January 26, 2014 || Haleakala || Pan-STARRS || H || align=right data-sort-value="0.58" | 580 m || 
|-id=018 bgcolor=#E9E9E9
| 540018 ||  || — || September 24, 2005 || Kitt Peak || Spacewatch ||  || align=right | 1.5 km || 
|-id=019 bgcolor=#d6d6d6
| 540019 ||  || — || October 4, 2007 || Mount Lemmon || Mount Lemmon Survey ||  || align=right | 2.2 km || 
|-id=020 bgcolor=#E9E9E9
| 540020 ||  || — || May 17, 2013 || Mount Lemmon || Mount Lemmon Survey ||  || align=right | 2.2 km || 
|-id=021 bgcolor=#fefefe
| 540021 ||  || — || January 10, 2014 || Catalina || CSS || H || align=right data-sort-value="0.74" | 740 m || 
|-id=022 bgcolor=#E9E9E9
| 540022 ||  || — || November 23, 2009 || Mount Lemmon || Mount Lemmon Survey ||  || align=right | 2.9 km || 
|-id=023 bgcolor=#E9E9E9
| 540023 ||  || — || August 26, 2013 || Haleakala || Pan-STARRS ||  || align=right | 1.7 km || 
|-id=024 bgcolor=#d6d6d6
| 540024 ||  || — || October 12, 2007 || Mount Lemmon || Mount Lemmon Survey ||  || align=right | 3.2 km || 
|-id=025 bgcolor=#fefefe
| 540025 ||  || — || November 24, 2011 || Haleakala || Pan-STARRS ||  || align=right data-sort-value="0.70" | 700 m || 
|-id=026 bgcolor=#d6d6d6
| 540026 ||  || — || November 28, 2013 || Mount Lemmon || Mount Lemmon Survey ||  || align=right | 3.1 km || 
|-id=027 bgcolor=#fefefe
| 540027 ||  || — || December 5, 2005 || Catalina || CSS || H || align=right data-sort-value="0.68" | 680 m || 
|-id=028 bgcolor=#E9E9E9
| 540028 ||  || — || January 12, 2011 || Kitt Peak || Spacewatch ||  || align=right | 2.8 km || 
|-id=029 bgcolor=#E9E9E9
| 540029 ||  || — || February 26, 2012 || Kitt Peak || Spacewatch ||  || align=right | 1.1 km || 
|-id=030 bgcolor=#fefefe
| 540030 ||  || — || January 31, 2009 || Mount Lemmon || Mount Lemmon Survey || H || align=right data-sort-value="0.69" | 690 m || 
|-id=031 bgcolor=#E9E9E9
| 540031 ||  || — || May 22, 2013 || Mount Lemmon || Mount Lemmon Survey ||  || align=right | 1.3 km || 
|-id=032 bgcolor=#d6d6d6
| 540032 ||  || — || December 18, 2014 || Haleakala || Pan-STARRS ||  || align=right | 3.4 km || 
|-id=033 bgcolor=#fefefe
| 540033 ||  || — || November 29, 2005 || Mount Lemmon || Mount Lemmon Survey || H || align=right data-sort-value="0.50" | 500 m || 
|-id=034 bgcolor=#fefefe
| 540034 ||  || — || December 2, 2015 || Catalina || CSS || H || align=right data-sort-value="0.66" | 660 m || 
|-id=035 bgcolor=#fefefe
| 540035 ||  || — || January 29, 2014 || Mount Lemmon || Mount Lemmon Survey || H || align=right data-sort-value="0.70" | 700 m || 
|-id=036 bgcolor=#E9E9E9
| 540036 ||  || — || August 28, 2005 || Siding Spring || SSS ||  || align=right | 1.5 km || 
|-id=037 bgcolor=#E9E9E9
| 540037 ||  || — || September 22, 2009 || Catalina || CSS ||  || align=right data-sort-value="0.87" | 870 m || 
|-id=038 bgcolor=#E9E9E9
| 540038 ||  || — || May 16, 2013 || Haleakala || Pan-STARRS ||  || align=right data-sort-value="0.97" | 970 m || 
|-id=039 bgcolor=#E9E9E9
| 540039 ||  || — || February 9, 2008 || Siding Spring || SSS ||  || align=right | 2.4 km || 
|-id=040 bgcolor=#fefefe
| 540040 ||  || — || May 22, 2006 || Kitt Peak || Spacewatch ||  || align=right data-sort-value="0.62" | 620 m || 
|-id=041 bgcolor=#d6d6d6
| 540041 ||  || — || September 26, 2013 || Mount Lemmon || Mount Lemmon Survey ||  || align=right | 2.5 km || 
|-id=042 bgcolor=#d6d6d6
| 540042 ||  || — || October 7, 2007 || Kitt Peak || Spacewatch ||  || align=right | 2.3 km || 
|-id=043 bgcolor=#d6d6d6
| 540043 ||  || — || October 31, 2010 || Mount Lemmon || Mount Lemmon Survey || 3:2 || align=right | 3.2 km || 
|-id=044 bgcolor=#d6d6d6
| 540044 ||  || — || February 10, 1999 || Kitt Peak || Spacewatch ||  || align=right | 3.0 km || 
|-id=045 bgcolor=#E9E9E9
| 540045 ||  || — || January 30, 2011 || Haleakala || Pan-STARRS ||  || align=right data-sort-value="0.83" | 830 m || 
|-id=046 bgcolor=#E9E9E9
| 540046 ||  || — || January 17, 2015 || Haleakala || Pan-STARRS ||  || align=right | 1.9 km || 
|-id=047 bgcolor=#E9E9E9
| 540047 ||  || — || September 14, 2013 || Haleakala || Pan-STARRS ||  || align=right | 1.4 km || 
|-id=048 bgcolor=#d6d6d6
| 540048 ||  || — || October 15, 2012 || Catalina || CSS ||  || align=right | 3.4 km || 
|-id=049 bgcolor=#E9E9E9
| 540049 ||  || — || June 3, 2008 || Kitt Peak || Spacewatch ||  || align=right | 1.5 km || 
|-id=050 bgcolor=#E9E9E9
| 540050 ||  || — || August 8, 2004 || Socorro || LINEAR ||  || align=right | 1.5 km || 
|-id=051 bgcolor=#fefefe
| 540051 ||  || — || October 12, 2015 || Mount Lemmon || Mount Lemmon Survey || H || align=right data-sort-value="0.67" | 670 m || 
|-id=052 bgcolor=#E9E9E9
| 540052 ||  || — || September 16, 2013 || Mount Lemmon || Mount Lemmon Survey ||  || align=right | 1.5 km || 
|-id=053 bgcolor=#d6d6d6
| 540053 ||  || — || July 22, 1995 || Kitt Peak || Spacewatch ||  || align=right | 3.1 km || 
|-id=054 bgcolor=#E9E9E9
| 540054 ||  || — || January 22, 2002 || Socorro || LINEAR ||  || align=right | 1.1 km || 
|-id=055 bgcolor=#d6d6d6
| 540055 ||  || — || January 21, 2015 || Haleakala || Pan-STARRS ||  || align=right | 3.4 km || 
|-id=056 bgcolor=#fefefe
| 540056 ||  || — || June 8, 2005 || Kitt Peak || Spacewatch ||  || align=right data-sort-value="0.81" | 810 m || 
|-id=057 bgcolor=#fefefe
| 540057 ||  || — || January 19, 2008 || Kitt Peak || Spacewatch ||  || align=right data-sort-value="0.59" | 590 m || 
|-id=058 bgcolor=#E9E9E9
| 540058 ||  || — || November 30, 2014 || Haleakala || Pan-STARRS ||  || align=right | 2.2 km || 
|-id=059 bgcolor=#d6d6d6
| 540059 ||  || — || January 17, 2009 || Mount Lemmon || Mount Lemmon Survey ||  || align=right | 2.8 km || 
|-id=060 bgcolor=#d6d6d6
| 540060 ||  || — || April 29, 2006 || Kitt Peak || Spacewatch ||  || align=right | 2.9 km || 
|-id=061 bgcolor=#d6d6d6
| 540061 ||  || — || November 22, 2008 || Kitt Peak || Spacewatch ||  || align=right | 2.9 km || 
|-id=062 bgcolor=#E9E9E9
| 540062 ||  || — || July 29, 2008 || Mount Lemmon || Mount Lemmon Survey ||  || align=right | 2.3 km || 
|-id=063 bgcolor=#d6d6d6
| 540063 ||  || — || September 25, 2006 || Kitt Peak || Spacewatch ||  || align=right | 3.7 km || 
|-id=064 bgcolor=#d6d6d6
| 540064 ||  || — || December 31, 2008 || Kitt Peak || Spacewatch ||  || align=right | 2.7 km || 
|-id=065 bgcolor=#d6d6d6
| 540065 ||  || — || August 27, 2006 || Kitt Peak || Spacewatch ||  || align=right | 2.3 km || 
|-id=066 bgcolor=#fefefe
| 540066 ||  || — || January 29, 2000 || Kitt Peak || Spacewatch ||  || align=right data-sort-value="0.85" | 850 m || 
|-id=067 bgcolor=#E9E9E9
| 540067 ||  || — || September 6, 2013 || Mount Lemmon || Mount Lemmon Survey ||  || align=right | 1.8 km || 
|-id=068 bgcolor=#E9E9E9
| 540068 ||  || — || July 6, 2005 || Kitt Peak || Spacewatch ||  || align=right data-sort-value="0.94" | 940 m || 
|-id=069 bgcolor=#d6d6d6
| 540069 ||  || — || January 15, 2004 || Kitt Peak || Spacewatch ||  || align=right | 3.0 km || 
|-id=070 bgcolor=#d6d6d6
| 540070 ||  || — || December 21, 2014 || Mount Lemmon || Mount Lemmon Survey ||  || align=right | 2.0 km || 
|-id=071 bgcolor=#d6d6d6
| 540071 ||  || — || February 1, 2009 || Kitt Peak || Spacewatch ||  || align=right | 2.8 km || 
|-id=072 bgcolor=#fefefe
| 540072 ||  || — || July 12, 2013 || Haleakala || Pan-STARRS ||  || align=right data-sort-value="0.79" | 790 m || 
|-id=073 bgcolor=#d6d6d6
| 540073 ||  || — || March 23, 2015 || Haleakala || Pan-STARRS ||  || align=right | 3.1 km || 
|-id=074 bgcolor=#d6d6d6
| 540074 ||  || — || May 2, 2016 || Haleakala || Pan-STARRS || 3:2 || align=right | 4.2 km || 
|-id=075 bgcolor=#E9E9E9
| 540075 ||  || — || November 28, 2013 || Mount Lemmon || Mount Lemmon Survey ||  || align=right | 1.8 km || 
|-id=076 bgcolor=#E9E9E9
| 540076 ||  || — || October 30, 2005 || Mount Lemmon || Mount Lemmon Survey ||  || align=right | 1.3 km || 
|-id=077 bgcolor=#d6d6d6
| 540077 ||  || — || February 3, 2009 || Kitt Peak || Spacewatch ||  || align=right | 2.7 km || 
|-id=078 bgcolor=#d6d6d6
| 540078 ||  || — || January 3, 2014 || Mount Lemmon || Mount Lemmon Survey ||  || align=right | 3.3 km || 
|-id=079 bgcolor=#d6d6d6
| 540079 ||  || — || January 30, 2010 || WISE || WISE ||  || align=right | 4.7 km || 
|-id=080 bgcolor=#d6d6d6
| 540080 ||  || — || April 14, 2004 || Kitt Peak || Spacewatch ||  || align=right | 4.1 km || 
|-id=081 bgcolor=#d6d6d6
| 540081 ||  || — || May 30, 2006 || Kitt Peak || Spacewatch ||  || align=right | 2.6 km || 
|-id=082 bgcolor=#d6d6d6
| 540082 ||  || — || October 27, 2005 || Mount Lemmon || Mount Lemmon Survey || 7:4 || align=right | 3.5 km || 
|-id=083 bgcolor=#d6d6d6
| 540083 ||  || — || January 23, 2015 || Haleakala || Pan-STARRS ||  || align=right | 2.8 km || 
|-id=084 bgcolor=#E9E9E9
| 540084 ||  || — || October 7, 2008 || Catalina || CSS ||  || align=right | 2.3 km || 
|-id=085 bgcolor=#d6d6d6
| 540085 ||  || — || August 29, 2006 || Kitt Peak || Spacewatch ||  || align=right | 2.5 km || 
|-id=086 bgcolor=#d6d6d6
| 540086 ||  || — || September 15, 2006 || Kitt Peak || Spacewatch ||  || align=right | 2.7 km || 
|-id=087 bgcolor=#fefefe
| 540087 ||  || — || August 27, 2009 || Kitt Peak || Spacewatch || H || align=right data-sort-value="0.62" | 620 m || 
|-id=088 bgcolor=#fefefe
| 540088 ||  || — || December 29, 2008 || Kitt Peak || Spacewatch ||  || align=right data-sort-value="0.76" | 760 m || 
|-id=089 bgcolor=#E9E9E9
| 540089 ||  || — || January 16, 2015 || Haleakala || Pan-STARRS ||  || align=right | 1.3 km || 
|-id=090 bgcolor=#d6d6d6
| 540090 ||  || — || January 23, 2015 || Haleakala || Pan-STARRS ||  || align=right | 3.2 km || 
|-id=091 bgcolor=#E9E9E9
| 540091 ||  || — || April 22, 2012 || Kitt Peak || Spacewatch ||  || align=right | 1.0 km || 
|-id=092 bgcolor=#E9E9E9
| 540092 ||  || — || November 6, 2013 || Mount Lemmon || Mount Lemmon Survey ||  || align=right | 1.2 km || 
|-id=093 bgcolor=#d6d6d6
| 540093 ||  || — || September 27, 2006 || Kitt Peak || Spacewatch ||  || align=right | 2.8 km || 
|-id=094 bgcolor=#d6d6d6
| 540094 ||  || — || October 11, 2002 || Kitt Peak || Spacewatch ||  || align=right | 2.5 km || 
|-id=095 bgcolor=#fefefe
| 540095 ||  || — || March 13, 2016 || Haleakala || Pan-STARRS ||  || align=right data-sort-value="0.69" | 690 m || 
|-id=096 bgcolor=#d6d6d6
| 540096 ||  || — || October 19, 2006 || Kitt Peak || Spacewatch ||  || align=right | 3.2 km || 
|-id=097 bgcolor=#fefefe
| 540097 ||  || — || October 23, 2004 || Kitt Peak || Spacewatch ||  || align=right data-sort-value="0.61" | 610 m || 
|-id=098 bgcolor=#fefefe
| 540098 ||  || — || September 17, 2006 || Catalina || CSS ||  || align=right data-sort-value="0.89" | 890 m || 
|-id=099 bgcolor=#d6d6d6
| 540099 ||  || — || September 21, 2012 || Mount Lemmon || Mount Lemmon Survey ||  || align=right | 3.1 km || 
|-id=100 bgcolor=#d6d6d6
| 540100 ||  || — || December 21, 2008 || Mount Lemmon || Mount Lemmon Survey ||  || align=right | 2.9 km || 
|}

540101–540200 

|-bgcolor=#d6d6d6
| 540101 ||  || — || January 25, 2015 || Haleakala || Pan-STARRS ||  || align=right | 2.2 km || 
|-id=102 bgcolor=#d6d6d6
| 540102 ||  || — || January 2, 2009 || Kitt Peak || Spacewatch ||  || align=right | 3.5 km || 
|-id=103 bgcolor=#E9E9E9
| 540103 ||  || — || December 8, 2010 || Mount Lemmon || Mount Lemmon Survey ||  || align=right | 2.0 km || 
|-id=104 bgcolor=#d6d6d6
| 540104 ||  || — || October 10, 2008 || Kitt Peak || Spacewatch ||  || align=right | 2.1 km || 
|-id=105 bgcolor=#d6d6d6
| 540105 ||  || — || November 19, 2003 || Kitt Peak || Spacewatch ||  || align=right | 2.5 km || 
|-id=106 bgcolor=#fefefe
| 540106 ||  || — || August 15, 2010 || La Sagra || OAM Obs. ||  || align=right data-sort-value="0.64" | 640 m || 
|-id=107 bgcolor=#d6d6d6
| 540107 ||  || — || September 9, 2007 || Kitt Peak || Spacewatch ||  || align=right | 2.8 km || 
|-id=108 bgcolor=#d6d6d6
| 540108 ||  || — || February 4, 2009 || Mount Lemmon || Mount Lemmon Survey ||  || align=right | 2.1 km || 
|-id=109 bgcolor=#fefefe
| 540109 ||  || — || July 14, 2013 || Haleakala || Pan-STARRS ||  || align=right data-sort-value="0.79" | 790 m || 
|-id=110 bgcolor=#E9E9E9
| 540110 ||  || — || September 7, 2004 || Kitt Peak || Spacewatch ||  || align=right | 1.2 km || 
|-id=111 bgcolor=#fefefe
| 540111 ||  || — || January 31, 2006 || Mount Lemmon || Mount Lemmon Survey ||  || align=right data-sort-value="0.69" | 690 m || 
|-id=112 bgcolor=#E9E9E9
| 540112 ||  || — || February 8, 2015 || Mount Lemmon || Mount Lemmon Survey ||  || align=right data-sort-value="0.76" | 760 m || 
|-id=113 bgcolor=#E9E9E9
| 540113 ||  || — || February 16, 2015 || Haleakala || Pan-STARRS ||  || align=right | 1.0 km || 
|-id=114 bgcolor=#fefefe
| 540114 ||  || — || March 14, 2012 || Kitt Peak || Spacewatch ||  || align=right data-sort-value="0.76" | 760 m || 
|-id=115 bgcolor=#d6d6d6
| 540115 ||  || — || March 18, 2010 || Mount Lemmon || Mount Lemmon Survey ||  || align=right | 3.0 km || 
|-id=116 bgcolor=#E9E9E9
| 540116 ||  || — || January 15, 2015 || Haleakala || Pan-STARRS ||  || align=right | 1.5 km || 
|-id=117 bgcolor=#fefefe
| 540117 ||  || — || July 14, 2013 || Haleakala || Pan-STARRS ||  || align=right data-sort-value="0.68" | 680 m || 
|-id=118 bgcolor=#E9E9E9
| 540118 ||  || — || October 30, 2005 || Mount Lemmon || Mount Lemmon Survey ||  || align=right | 1.1 km || 
|-id=119 bgcolor=#d6d6d6
| 540119 ||  || — || January 1, 2014 || Kitt Peak || Spacewatch ||  || align=right | 2.7 km || 
|-id=120 bgcolor=#fefefe
| 540120 ||  || — || January 11, 2008 || Kitt Peak || Spacewatch ||  || align=right data-sort-value="0.64" | 640 m || 
|-id=121 bgcolor=#d6d6d6
| 540121 ||  || — || May 26, 2006 || Kitt Peak || Spacewatch ||  || align=right | 2.0 km || 
|-id=122 bgcolor=#E9E9E9
| 540122 ||  || — || February 18, 2015 || Haleakala || Pan-STARRS ||  || align=right data-sort-value="0.84" | 840 m || 
|-id=123 bgcolor=#d6d6d6
| 540123 ||  || — || February 16, 2015 || Haleakala || Pan-STARRS ||  || align=right | 2.3 km || 
|-id=124 bgcolor=#fefefe
| 540124 ||  || — || April 15, 2012 || Haleakala || Pan-STARRS ||  || align=right data-sort-value="0.75" | 750 m || 
|-id=125 bgcolor=#fefefe
| 540125 ||  || — || January 6, 2012 || Kitt Peak || Spacewatch ||  || align=right data-sort-value="0.66" | 660 m || 
|-id=126 bgcolor=#fefefe
| 540126 ||  || — || January 11, 2008 || Mount Lemmon || Mount Lemmon Survey ||  || align=right data-sort-value="0.67" | 670 m || 
|-id=127 bgcolor=#E9E9E9
| 540127 ||  || — || January 21, 2006 || Kitt Peak || Spacewatch ||  || align=right | 1.3 km || 
|-id=128 bgcolor=#d6d6d6
| 540128 ||  || — || February 19, 2009 || Mount Lemmon || Mount Lemmon Survey ||  || align=right | 2.3 km || 
|-id=129 bgcolor=#d6d6d6
| 540129 ||  || — || November 20, 2000 || Socorro || LINEAR || Tj (2.96) || align=right | 5.8 km || 
|-id=130 bgcolor=#fefefe
| 540130 ||  || — || September 30, 2014 || Mount Lemmon || Mount Lemmon Survey ||  || align=right data-sort-value="0.53" | 530 m || 
|-id=131 bgcolor=#fefefe
| 540131 ||  || — || December 6, 2011 || Haleakala || Pan-STARRS ||  || align=right data-sort-value="0.64" | 640 m || 
|-id=132 bgcolor=#E9E9E9
| 540132 ||  || — || December 8, 2010 || Mount Lemmon || Mount Lemmon Survey ||  || align=right data-sort-value="0.89" | 890 m || 
|-id=133 bgcolor=#d6d6d6
| 540133 ||  || — || November 6, 2008 || Kitt Peak || Spacewatch ||  || align=right | 2.6 km || 
|-id=134 bgcolor=#fefefe
| 540134 ||  || — || April 8, 2013 || Mount Lemmon || Mount Lemmon Survey ||  || align=right data-sort-value="0.65" | 650 m || 
|-id=135 bgcolor=#E9E9E9
| 540135 ||  || — || October 1, 2005 || Anderson Mesa || LONEOS ||  || align=right data-sort-value="0.89" | 890 m || 
|-id=136 bgcolor=#E9E9E9
| 540136 ||  || — || January 31, 2006 || Kitt Peak || Spacewatch ||  || align=right | 2.0 km || 
|-id=137 bgcolor=#fefefe
| 540137 ||  || — || March 21, 2010 || Kitt Peak || Spacewatch ||  || align=right data-sort-value="0.74" | 740 m || 
|-id=138 bgcolor=#d6d6d6
| 540138 ||  || — || January 8, 2010 || WISE || WISE ||  || align=right | 3.1 km || 
|-id=139 bgcolor=#E9E9E9
| 540139 ||  || — || March 12, 2007 || Kitt Peak || Spacewatch ||  || align=right | 1.4 km || 
|-id=140 bgcolor=#E9E9E9
| 540140 ||  || — || November 8, 2009 || Mount Lemmon || Mount Lemmon Survey ||  || align=right | 1.5 km || 
|-id=141 bgcolor=#E9E9E9
| 540141 ||  || — || February 1, 2010 || WISE || WISE ||  || align=right | 3.6 km || 
|-id=142 bgcolor=#d6d6d6
| 540142 ||  || — || January 27, 2003 || Socorro || LINEAR ||  || align=right | 3.1 km || 
|-id=143 bgcolor=#E9E9E9
| 540143 ||  || — || November 11, 2004 || Kitt Peak || Spacewatch ||  || align=right | 3.1 km || 
|-id=144 bgcolor=#fefefe
| 540144 ||  || — || August 11, 2012 || Siding Spring || SSS || H || align=right data-sort-value="0.67" | 670 m || 
|-id=145 bgcolor=#fefefe
| 540145 ||  || — || October 11, 2010 || Mount Lemmon || Mount Lemmon Survey ||  || align=right data-sort-value="0.82" | 820 m || 
|-id=146 bgcolor=#E9E9E9
| 540146 ||  || — || September 2, 2008 || Kitt Peak || Spacewatch ||  || align=right | 2.0 km || 
|-id=147 bgcolor=#E9E9E9
| 540147 ||  || — || October 8, 1999 || Kitt Peak || Spacewatch ||  || align=right | 2.1 km || 
|-id=148 bgcolor=#E9E9E9
| 540148 ||  || — || March 31, 2011 || Haleakala || Pan-STARRS ||  || align=right | 1.8 km || 
|-id=149 bgcolor=#fefefe
| 540149 ||  || — || December 30, 2008 || Mount Lemmon || Mount Lemmon Survey ||  || align=right data-sort-value="0.48" | 480 m || 
|-id=150 bgcolor=#fefefe
| 540150 ||  || — || January 27, 2006 || Kitt Peak || Spacewatch ||  || align=right data-sort-value="0.73" | 730 m || 
|-id=151 bgcolor=#E9E9E9
| 540151 ||  || — || January 4, 2011 || Mount Lemmon || Mount Lemmon Survey ||  || align=right | 1.6 km || 
|-id=152 bgcolor=#fefefe
| 540152 ||  || — || September 10, 2007 || Mount Lemmon || Mount Lemmon Survey ||  || align=right data-sort-value="0.64" | 640 m || 
|-id=153 bgcolor=#d6d6d6
| 540153 ||  || — || October 10, 2007 || Mount Lemmon || Mount Lemmon Survey ||  || align=right | 2.1 km || 
|-id=154 bgcolor=#E9E9E9
| 540154 ||  || — || September 7, 1999 || Kitt Peak || Spacewatch ||  || align=right | 2.1 km || 
|-id=155 bgcolor=#d6d6d6
| 540155 ||  || — || October 22, 2012 || Haleakala || Pan-STARRS || 7:4 || align=right | 2.8 km || 
|-id=156 bgcolor=#E9E9E9
| 540156 ||  || — || February 24, 2006 || Kitt Peak || Spacewatch ||  || align=right | 2.2 km || 
|-id=157 bgcolor=#fefefe
| 540157 ||  || — || February 1, 2009 || Mount Lemmon || Mount Lemmon Survey ||  || align=right data-sort-value="0.75" | 750 m || 
|-id=158 bgcolor=#d6d6d6
| 540158 ||  || — || October 12, 2007 || Kitt Peak || Spacewatch ||  || align=right | 2.3 km || 
|-id=159 bgcolor=#d6d6d6
| 540159 ||  || — || June 5, 2010 || WISE || WISE ||  || align=right | 3.2 km || 
|-id=160 bgcolor=#d6d6d6
| 540160 ||  || — || April 27, 2011 || Mount Lemmon || Mount Lemmon Survey ||  || align=right | 2.3 km || 
|-id=161 bgcolor=#fefefe
| 540161 ||  || — || December 12, 2004 || Kitt Peak || Spacewatch ||  || align=right data-sort-value="0.61" | 610 m || 
|-id=162 bgcolor=#E9E9E9
| 540162 ||  || — || March 9, 2007 || Kitt Peak || Spacewatch ||  || align=right data-sort-value="0.85" | 850 m || 
|-id=163 bgcolor=#E9E9E9
| 540163 ||  || — || September 15, 2004 || Socorro || LINEAR ||  || align=right | 1.5 km || 
|-id=164 bgcolor=#E9E9E9
| 540164 ||  || — || November 26, 2009 || Mount Lemmon || Mount Lemmon Survey ||  || align=right | 1.1 km || 
|-id=165 bgcolor=#fefefe
| 540165 ||  || — || August 27, 2006 || Kitt Peak || Spacewatch ||  || align=right data-sort-value="0.80" | 800 m || 
|-id=166 bgcolor=#d6d6d6
| 540166 ||  || — || January 3, 2009 || Kitt Peak || Spacewatch ||  || align=right | 2.7 km || 
|-id=167 bgcolor=#E9E9E9
| 540167 ||  || — || December 27, 2006 || Mount Lemmon || Mount Lemmon Survey ||  || align=right data-sort-value="0.83" | 830 m || 
|-id=168 bgcolor=#d6d6d6
| 540168 ||  || — || December 4, 2008 || Mount Lemmon || Mount Lemmon Survey ||  || align=right | 2.4 km || 
|-id=169 bgcolor=#E9E9E9
| 540169 ||  || — || November 27, 2014 || Haleakala || Pan-STARRS ||  || align=right | 1.2 km || 
|-id=170 bgcolor=#fefefe
| 540170 ||  || — || October 13, 2010 || Mount Lemmon || Mount Lemmon Survey ||  || align=right data-sort-value="0.77" | 770 m || 
|-id=171 bgcolor=#E9E9E9
| 540171 ||  || — || September 17, 2009 || Kitt Peak || Spacewatch ||  || align=right | 1.4 km || 
|-id=172 bgcolor=#d6d6d6
| 540172 ||  || — || October 23, 2012 || Mount Lemmon || Mount Lemmon Survey ||  || align=right | 3.0 km || 
|-id=173 bgcolor=#E9E9E9
| 540173 ||  || — || June 30, 2008 || Kitt Peak || Spacewatch ||  || align=right | 1.3 km || 
|-id=174 bgcolor=#fefefe
| 540174 ||  || — || May 8, 2005 || Kitt Peak || Spacewatch ||  || align=right data-sort-value="0.78" | 780 m || 
|-id=175 bgcolor=#E9E9E9
| 540175 ||  || — || January 11, 2010 || Kitt Peak || Spacewatch ||  || align=right | 1.7 km || 
|-id=176 bgcolor=#d6d6d6
| 540176 ||  || — || December 3, 2008 || Kitt Peak || Spacewatch ||  || align=right | 3.1 km || 
|-id=177 bgcolor=#fefefe
| 540177 ||  || — || January 16, 2005 || Kitt Peak || Spacewatch ||  || align=right | 1.2 km || 
|-id=178 bgcolor=#fefefe
| 540178 ||  || — || January 31, 2009 || Mount Lemmon || Mount Lemmon Survey ||  || align=right data-sort-value="0.88" | 880 m || 
|-id=179 bgcolor=#d6d6d6
| 540179 ||  || — || February 15, 2010 || Kitt Peak || Spacewatch ||  || align=right | 2.4 km || 
|-id=180 bgcolor=#E9E9E9
| 540180 ||  || — || May 13, 2004 || Kitt Peak || Spacewatch ||  || align=right | 1.2 km || 
|-id=181 bgcolor=#E9E9E9
| 540181 ||  || — || February 3, 2010 || WISE || WISE ||  || align=right | 1.4 km || 
|-id=182 bgcolor=#E9E9E9
| 540182 ||  || — || February 27, 2006 || Kitt Peak || Spacewatch ||  || align=right | 2.3 km || 
|-id=183 bgcolor=#E9E9E9
| 540183 ||  || — || February 25, 2006 || Kitt Peak || Spacewatch ||  || align=right | 1.3 km || 
|-id=184 bgcolor=#fefefe
| 540184 ||  || — || October 12, 1998 || Kitt Peak || Spacewatch ||  || align=right | 1.1 km || 
|-id=185 bgcolor=#FA8072
| 540185 ||  || — || February 20, 2002 || Kitt Peak || Spacewatch || H || align=right data-sort-value="0.55" | 550 m || 
|-id=186 bgcolor=#d6d6d6
| 540186 ||  || — || January 8, 2010 || Kitt Peak || Spacewatch ||  || align=right | 2.4 km || 
|-id=187 bgcolor=#fefefe
| 540187 ||  || — || February 2, 2008 || Kitt Peak || Spacewatch ||  || align=right | 1.5 km || 
|-id=188 bgcolor=#E9E9E9
| 540188 ||  || — || February 25, 2006 || Kitt Peak || Spacewatch ||  || align=right | 2.8 km || 
|-id=189 bgcolor=#d6d6d6
| 540189 ||  || — || January 31, 2009 || Mount Lemmon || Mount Lemmon Survey ||  || align=right | 3.6 km || 
|-id=190 bgcolor=#E9E9E9
| 540190 ||  || — || March 1, 2011 || Mount Lemmon || Mount Lemmon Survey ||  || align=right | 1.2 km || 
|-id=191 bgcolor=#E9E9E9
| 540191 ||  || — || February 10, 2007 || Mount Lemmon || Mount Lemmon Survey ||  || align=right | 2.1 km || 
|-id=192 bgcolor=#E9E9E9
| 540192 ||  || — || October 1, 2013 || Kitt Peak || Spacewatch ||  || align=right | 1.7 km || 
|-id=193 bgcolor=#E9E9E9
| 540193 ||  || — || November 15, 1995 || Kitt Peak || Spacewatch ||  || align=right | 2.2 km || 
|-id=194 bgcolor=#fefefe
| 540194 ||  || — || September 11, 2010 || Mount Lemmon || Mount Lemmon Survey ||  || align=right data-sort-value="0.81" | 810 m || 
|-id=195 bgcolor=#d6d6d6
| 540195 ||  || — || June 27, 2010 || WISE || WISE ||  || align=right | 3.2 km || 
|-id=196 bgcolor=#d6d6d6
| 540196 ||  || — || July 21, 2010 || WISE || WISE ||  || align=right | 2.8 km || 
|-id=197 bgcolor=#d6d6d6
| 540197 ||  || — || January 19, 2004 || Kitt Peak || Spacewatch ||  || align=right | 2.8 km || 
|-id=198 bgcolor=#fefefe
| 540198 ||  || — || May 1, 2010 || WISE || WISE ||  || align=right data-sort-value="0.79" | 790 m || 
|-id=199 bgcolor=#E9E9E9
| 540199 ||  || — || January 6, 2010 || Kitt Peak || Spacewatch ||  || align=right | 2.3 km || 
|-id=200 bgcolor=#d6d6d6
| 540200 ||  || — || December 3, 2007 || Kitt Peak || Spacewatch ||  || align=right | 2.8 km || 
|}

540201–540300 

|-bgcolor=#d6d6d6
| 540201 ||  || — || August 10, 2007 || Kitt Peak || Spacewatch ||  || align=right | 2.6 km || 
|-id=202 bgcolor=#E9E9E9
| 540202 ||  || — || September 24, 2008 || Kitt Peak || Spacewatch ||  || align=right | 1.8 km || 
|-id=203 bgcolor=#fefefe
| 540203 ||  || — || June 18, 2013 || Haleakala || Pan-STARRS ||  || align=right data-sort-value="0.59" | 590 m || 
|-id=204 bgcolor=#fefefe
| 540204 ||  || — || October 24, 2011 || Haleakala || Pan-STARRS ||  || align=right data-sort-value="0.47" | 470 m || 
|-id=205 bgcolor=#C7FF8F
| 540205 ||  || — || August 9, 2016 || Haleakala || Pan-STARRS || unusual || align=right | 5.4 km || 
|-id=206 bgcolor=#fefefe
| 540206 ||  || — || March 11, 2008 || Mount Lemmon || Mount Lemmon Survey ||  || align=right | 1.5 km || 
|-id=207 bgcolor=#E9E9E9
| 540207 ||  || — || September 10, 2013 || Haleakala || Pan-STARRS ||  || align=right | 1.1 km || 
|-id=208 bgcolor=#d6d6d6
| 540208 ||  || — || May 16, 2010 || WISE || WISE ||  || align=right | 2.4 km || 
|-id=209 bgcolor=#E9E9E9
| 540209 ||  || — || November 11, 2013 || Mount Lemmon || Mount Lemmon Survey ||  || align=right | 1.9 km || 
|-id=210 bgcolor=#E9E9E9
| 540210 ||  || — || October 3, 2013 || Catalina || CSS ||  || align=right data-sort-value="0.91" | 910 m || 
|-id=211 bgcolor=#d6d6d6
| 540211 ||  || — || December 18, 2003 || Kitt Peak || Spacewatch ||  || align=right | 3.2 km || 
|-id=212 bgcolor=#fefefe
| 540212 ||  || — || November 17, 2007 || Mount Lemmon || Mount Lemmon Survey ||  || align=right data-sort-value="0.71" | 710 m || 
|-id=213 bgcolor=#fefefe
| 540213 ||  || — || November 17, 2011 || Mount Lemmon || Mount Lemmon Survey ||  || align=right data-sort-value="0.94" | 940 m || 
|-id=214 bgcolor=#fefefe
| 540214 ||  || — || October 21, 2006 || Kitt Peak || Spacewatch ||  || align=right data-sort-value="0.86" | 860 m || 
|-id=215 bgcolor=#fefefe
| 540215 ||  || — || January 8, 2002 || Socorro || LINEAR ||  || align=right data-sort-value="0.70" | 700 m || 
|-id=216 bgcolor=#fefefe
| 540216 ||  || — || August 7, 2010 || XuYi || PMO NEO ||  || align=right data-sort-value="0.74" | 740 m || 
|-id=217 bgcolor=#E9E9E9
| 540217 ||  || — || January 27, 2006 || Mount Lemmon || Mount Lemmon Survey ||  || align=right | 1.5 km || 
|-id=218 bgcolor=#E9E9E9
| 540218 ||  || — || March 16, 2010 || WISE || WISE ||  || align=right | 1.4 km || 
|-id=219 bgcolor=#E9E9E9
| 540219 ||  || — || November 10, 2009 || Kitt Peak || Spacewatch ||  || align=right | 1.1 km || 
|-id=220 bgcolor=#d6d6d6
| 540220 ||  || — || November 9, 2007 || Kitt Peak || Spacewatch ||  || align=right | 2.9 km || 
|-id=221 bgcolor=#fefefe
| 540221 ||  || — || October 31, 2006 || Mount Lemmon || Mount Lemmon Survey ||  || align=right data-sort-value="0.70" | 700 m || 
|-id=222 bgcolor=#d6d6d6
| 540222 ||  || — || September 14, 2007 || Mount Lemmon || Mount Lemmon Survey ||  || align=right | 2.7 km || 
|-id=223 bgcolor=#E9E9E9
| 540223 ||  || — || April 13, 2004 || Kitt Peak || Spacewatch ||  || align=right data-sort-value="0.98" | 980 m || 
|-id=224 bgcolor=#d6d6d6
| 540224 ||  || — || August 26, 2012 || Haleakala || Pan-STARRS ||  || align=right | 2.9 km || 
|-id=225 bgcolor=#d6d6d6
| 540225 ||  || — || February 3, 2009 || Kitt Peak || Spacewatch ||  || align=right | 3.4 km || 
|-id=226 bgcolor=#E9E9E9
| 540226 ||  || — || September 9, 2004 || Kitt Peak || Spacewatch ||  || align=right | 1.3 km || 
|-id=227 bgcolor=#fefefe
| 540227 ||  || — || August 12, 2010 || Kitt Peak || Spacewatch ||  || align=right data-sort-value="0.74" | 740 m || 
|-id=228 bgcolor=#fefefe
| 540228 ||  || — || January 3, 2011 || Mount Lemmon || Mount Lemmon Survey ||  || align=right data-sort-value="0.74" | 740 m || 
|-id=229 bgcolor=#E9E9E9
| 540229 ||  || — || October 9, 2008 || Mount Lemmon || Mount Lemmon Survey ||  || align=right | 1.8 km || 
|-id=230 bgcolor=#d6d6d6
| 540230 ||  || — || July 10, 2005 || Siding Spring || SSS ||  || align=right | 6.0 km || 
|-id=231 bgcolor=#E9E9E9
| 540231 ||  || — || September 4, 2008 || Kitt Peak || Spacewatch ||  || align=right | 2.1 km || 
|-id=232 bgcolor=#fefefe
| 540232 ||  || — || January 18, 2008 || Kitt Peak || Spacewatch ||  || align=right data-sort-value="0.75" | 750 m || 
|-id=233 bgcolor=#fefefe
| 540233 ||  || — || April 30, 2012 || Mount Lemmon || Mount Lemmon Survey ||  || align=right data-sort-value="0.99" | 990 m || 
|-id=234 bgcolor=#E9E9E9
| 540234 ||  || — || October 6, 2008 || Mount Lemmon || Mount Lemmon Survey ||  || align=right | 2.0 km || 
|-id=235 bgcolor=#E9E9E9
| 540235 ||  || — || October 1, 2008 || Mount Lemmon || Mount Lemmon Survey ||  || align=right | 2.0 km || 
|-id=236 bgcolor=#E9E9E9
| 540236 ||  || — || October 30, 2005 || Kitt Peak || Spacewatch ||  || align=right | 1.0 km || 
|-id=237 bgcolor=#E9E9E9
| 540237 ||  || — || January 31, 2006 || Mount Lemmon || Mount Lemmon Survey ||  || align=right | 1.9 km || 
|-id=238 bgcolor=#fefefe
| 540238 ||  || — || February 12, 2008 || Mount Lemmon || Mount Lemmon Survey ||  || align=right data-sort-value="0.66" | 660 m || 
|-id=239 bgcolor=#E9E9E9
| 540239 ||  || — || April 12, 2011 || Mount Lemmon || Mount Lemmon Survey ||  || align=right | 2.4 km || 
|-id=240 bgcolor=#E9E9E9
| 540240 ||  || — || February 2, 2006 || Kitt Peak || Spacewatch ||  || align=right | 2.2 km || 
|-id=241 bgcolor=#fefefe
| 540241 ||  || — || January 20, 2012 || Mount Lemmon || Mount Lemmon Survey ||  || align=right data-sort-value="0.68" | 680 m || 
|-id=242 bgcolor=#E9E9E9
| 540242 ||  || — || August 26, 2008 || Socorro || LINEAR ||  || align=right | 1.7 km || 
|-id=243 bgcolor=#E9E9E9
| 540243 ||  || — || May 3, 2006 || Kitt Peak || Spacewatch ||  || align=right | 3.1 km || 
|-id=244 bgcolor=#d6d6d6
| 540244 ||  || — || November 27, 2013 || Haleakala || Pan-STARRS ||  || align=right | 2.0 km || 
|-id=245 bgcolor=#E9E9E9
| 540245 ||  || — || September 17, 2003 || Kitt Peak || Spacewatch ||  || align=right | 2.3 km || 
|-id=246 bgcolor=#fefefe
| 540246 ||  || — || September 15, 2006 || Kitt Peak || Spacewatch ||  || align=right | 1.9 km || 
|-id=247 bgcolor=#d6d6d6
| 540247 ||  || — || August 19, 2006 || Kitt Peak || Spacewatch ||  || align=right | 3.7 km || 
|-id=248 bgcolor=#E9E9E9
| 540248 ||  || — || March 3, 2006 || Kitt Peak || Spacewatch ||  || align=right | 2.2 km || 
|-id=249 bgcolor=#E9E9E9
| 540249 ||  || — || March 30, 2011 || Mount Lemmon || Mount Lemmon Survey ||  || align=right | 1.3 km || 
|-id=250 bgcolor=#E9E9E9
| 540250 ||  || — || December 10, 2009 || Mount Lemmon || Mount Lemmon Survey ||  || align=right | 2.0 km || 
|-id=251 bgcolor=#d6d6d6
| 540251 ||  || — || September 20, 1995 || Kitt Peak || Spacewatch ||  || align=right | 2.8 km || 
|-id=252 bgcolor=#fefefe
| 540252 ||  || — || November 5, 2010 || Kitt Peak || Spacewatch ||  || align=right data-sort-value="0.72" | 720 m || 
|-id=253 bgcolor=#d6d6d6
| 540253 ||  || — || August 19, 2006 || Kitt Peak || Spacewatch ||  || align=right | 3.2 km || 
|-id=254 bgcolor=#E9E9E9
| 540254 ||  || — || March 29, 2011 || Mount Lemmon || Mount Lemmon Survey ||  || align=right | 1.3 km || 
|-id=255 bgcolor=#d6d6d6
| 540255 ||  || — || July 28, 2009 || Kitt Peak || Spacewatch || 3:2 || align=right | 4.1 km || 
|-id=256 bgcolor=#E9E9E9
| 540256 ||  || — || October 1, 2013 || Kitt Peak || Spacewatch ||  || align=right | 1.1 km || 
|-id=257 bgcolor=#d6d6d6
| 540257 ||  || — || October 21, 2001 || Kitt Peak || Spacewatch ||  || align=right | 2.1 km || 
|-id=258 bgcolor=#E9E9E9
| 540258 ||  || — || February 14, 2005 || Kitt Peak || Spacewatch ||  || align=right | 1.4 km || 
|-id=259 bgcolor=#fefefe
| 540259 ||  || — || November 14, 2007 || Kitt Peak || Spacewatch ||  || align=right data-sort-value="0.91" | 910 m || 
|-id=260 bgcolor=#E9E9E9
| 540260 ||  || — || September 11, 2004 || Kitt Peak || Spacewatch ||  || align=right | 1.2 km || 
|-id=261 bgcolor=#d6d6d6
| 540261 ||  || — || October 17, 2012 || Haleakala || Pan-STARRS ||  || align=right | 2.0 km || 
|-id=262 bgcolor=#E9E9E9
| 540262 ||  || — || September 4, 2008 || Kitt Peak || Spacewatch ||  || align=right | 1.6 km || 
|-id=263 bgcolor=#d6d6d6
| 540263 ||  || — || January 16, 2009 || Kitt Peak || Spacewatch ||  || align=right | 1.7 km || 
|-id=264 bgcolor=#fefefe
| 540264 ||  || — || January 26, 2009 || Mount Lemmon || Mount Lemmon Survey ||  || align=right data-sort-value="0.67" | 670 m || 
|-id=265 bgcolor=#d6d6d6
| 540265 ||  || — || February 19, 2009 || Mount Lemmon || Mount Lemmon Survey ||  || align=right | 2.9 km || 
|-id=266 bgcolor=#E9E9E9
| 540266 ||  || — || October 7, 2004 || Kitt Peak || Spacewatch ||  || align=right | 1.3 km || 
|-id=267 bgcolor=#E9E9E9
| 540267 ||  || — || August 21, 2008 || Kitt Peak || Spacewatch ||  || align=right | 2.0 km || 
|-id=268 bgcolor=#E9E9E9
| 540268 ||  || — || October 19, 1995 || Kitt Peak || Spacewatch ||  || align=right | 1.4 km || 
|-id=269 bgcolor=#d6d6d6
| 540269 ||  || — || December 1, 2003 || Kitt Peak || Spacewatch ||  || align=right | 2.5 km || 
|-id=270 bgcolor=#E9E9E9
| 540270 ||  || — || October 8, 2004 || Kitt Peak || Spacewatch ||  || align=right | 1.5 km || 
|-id=271 bgcolor=#fefefe
| 540271 ||  || — || October 23, 2006 || Kitt Peak || Spacewatch ||  || align=right data-sort-value="0.58" | 580 m || 
|-id=272 bgcolor=#E9E9E9
| 540272 ||  || — || November 4, 2004 || Kitt Peak || Spacewatch ||  || align=right | 1.5 km || 
|-id=273 bgcolor=#d6d6d6
| 540273 ||  || — || February 27, 2009 || Kitt Peak || Spacewatch ||  || align=right | 2.8 km || 
|-id=274 bgcolor=#d6d6d6
| 540274 ||  || — || April 24, 2004 || Kitt Peak || Spacewatch ||  || align=right | 2.1 km || 
|-id=275 bgcolor=#E9E9E9
| 540275 ||  || — || October 3, 2008 || Mount Lemmon || Mount Lemmon Survey ||  || align=right | 1.6 km || 
|-id=276 bgcolor=#E9E9E9
| 540276 ||  || — || November 2, 2013 || Kitt Peak || Spacewatch ||  || align=right | 1.7 km || 
|-id=277 bgcolor=#E9E9E9
| 540277 ||  || — || September 27, 2008 || Mount Lemmon || Mount Lemmon Survey ||  || align=right | 1.9 km || 
|-id=278 bgcolor=#E9E9E9
| 540278 ||  || — || October 9, 2008 || Mount Lemmon || Mount Lemmon Survey ||  || align=right | 1.4 km || 
|-id=279 bgcolor=#d6d6d6
| 540279 ||  || — || October 31, 2008 || Kitt Peak || Spacewatch ||  || align=right | 2.0 km || 
|-id=280 bgcolor=#E9E9E9
| 540280 ||  || — || April 2, 2006 || Kitt Peak || Spacewatch ||  || align=right | 2.6 km || 
|-id=281 bgcolor=#E9E9E9
| 540281 ||  || — || October 8, 2004 || Kitt Peak || Spacewatch ||  || align=right | 1.4 km || 
|-id=282 bgcolor=#E9E9E9
| 540282 ||  || — || November 11, 2004 || Kitt Peak || Spacewatch ||  || align=right | 2.0 km || 
|-id=283 bgcolor=#d6d6d6
| 540283 ||  || — || September 28, 2006 || Kitt Peak || Spacewatch ||  || align=right | 3.2 km || 
|-id=284 bgcolor=#fefefe
| 540284 ||  || — || April 13, 2013 || Haleakala || Pan-STARRS ||  || align=right data-sort-value="0.57" | 570 m || 
|-id=285 bgcolor=#d6d6d6
| 540285 ||  || — || September 28, 2003 || Kitt Peak || Spacewatch ||  || align=right | 2.5 km || 
|-id=286 bgcolor=#fefefe
| 540286 ||  || — || March 24, 2009 || Mount Lemmon || Mount Lemmon Survey ||  || align=right data-sort-value="0.47" | 470 m || 
|-id=287 bgcolor=#fefefe
| 540287 ||  || — || October 13, 2014 || Mount Lemmon || Mount Lemmon Survey ||  || align=right data-sort-value="0.67" | 670 m || 
|-id=288 bgcolor=#fefefe
| 540288 ||  || — || February 26, 2012 || Kitt Peak || Spacewatch ||  || align=right | 1.1 km || 
|-id=289 bgcolor=#E9E9E9
| 540289 ||  || — || September 23, 2008 || Mount Lemmon || Mount Lemmon Survey ||  || align=right | 2.9 km || 
|-id=290 bgcolor=#fefefe
| 540290 ||  || — || December 4, 2007 || Kitt Peak || Spacewatch ||  || align=right data-sort-value="0.54" | 540 m || 
|-id=291 bgcolor=#fefefe
| 540291 ||  || — || February 10, 2008 || Mount Lemmon || Mount Lemmon Survey ||  || align=right data-sort-value="0.75" | 750 m || 
|-id=292 bgcolor=#fefefe
| 540292 ||  || — || November 9, 2007 || Mount Lemmon || Mount Lemmon Survey ||  || align=right data-sort-value="0.93" | 930 m || 
|-id=293 bgcolor=#E9E9E9
| 540293 ||  || — || March 11, 2010 || WISE || WISE ||  || align=right | 2.2 km || 
|-id=294 bgcolor=#E9E9E9
| 540294 ||  || — || October 7, 2004 || Anderson Mesa || LONEOS ||  || align=right | 1.4 km || 
|-id=295 bgcolor=#E9E9E9
| 540295 ||  || — || October 26, 2005 || Kitt Peak || Spacewatch ||  || align=right data-sort-value="0.62" | 620 m || 
|-id=296 bgcolor=#E9E9E9
| 540296 ||  || — || October 2, 2013 || Kitt Peak || Spacewatch ||  || align=right | 1.3 km || 
|-id=297 bgcolor=#d6d6d6
| 540297 ||  || — || February 28, 2009 || Kitt Peak || Spacewatch ||  || align=right | 1.7 km || 
|-id=298 bgcolor=#E9E9E9
| 540298 ||  || — || September 28, 2013 || Catalina || CSS ||  || align=right | 1.5 km || 
|-id=299 bgcolor=#E9E9E9
| 540299 ||  || — || February 14, 2015 || Mount Lemmon || Mount Lemmon Survey ||  || align=right | 2.7 km || 
|-id=300 bgcolor=#d6d6d6
| 540300 ||  || — || February 13, 2010 || WISE || WISE ||  || align=right | 4.7 km || 
|}

540301–540400 

|-bgcolor=#fefefe
| 540301 ||  || — || February 18, 2008 || Mount Lemmon || Mount Lemmon Survey ||  || align=right | 1.4 km || 
|-id=302 bgcolor=#d6d6d6
| 540302 ||  || — || December 21, 2008 || Mount Lemmon || Mount Lemmon Survey ||  || align=right | 2.1 km || 
|-id=303 bgcolor=#d6d6d6
| 540303 ||  || — || January 31, 2009 || Mount Lemmon || Mount Lemmon Survey ||  || align=right | 2.4 km || 
|-id=304 bgcolor=#E9E9E9
| 540304 ||  || — || February 7, 2002 || Kitt Peak || Spacewatch ||  || align=right | 1.7 km || 
|-id=305 bgcolor=#fefefe
| 540305 ||  || — || August 26, 2013 || Haleakala || Pan-STARRS ||  || align=right data-sort-value="0.71" | 710 m || 
|-id=306 bgcolor=#E9E9E9
| 540306 ||  || — || January 7, 2006 || Kitt Peak || Spacewatch ||  || align=right | 1.6 km || 
|-id=307 bgcolor=#d6d6d6
| 540307 ||  || — || July 21, 2006 || Mount Lemmon || Mount Lemmon Survey ||  || align=right | 2.3 km || 
|-id=308 bgcolor=#fefefe
| 540308 ||  || — || September 10, 2007 || Mount Lemmon || Mount Lemmon Survey ||  || align=right data-sort-value="0.67" | 670 m || 
|-id=309 bgcolor=#d6d6d6
| 540309 ||  || — || October 30, 2008 || Kitt Peak || Spacewatch ||  || align=right | 2.7 km || 
|-id=310 bgcolor=#fefefe
| 540310 ||  || — || January 10, 2008 || Mount Lemmon || Mount Lemmon Survey ||  || align=right data-sort-value="0.80" | 800 m || 
|-id=311 bgcolor=#fefefe
| 540311 ||  || — || September 19, 2006 || Catalina || CSS ||  || align=right data-sort-value="0.89" | 890 m || 
|-id=312 bgcolor=#fefefe
| 540312 ||  || — || April 30, 2009 || Catalina || CSS ||  || align=right data-sort-value="0.83" | 830 m || 
|-id=313 bgcolor=#fefefe
| 540313 ||  || — || February 11, 2004 || Kitt Peak || Spacewatch ||  || align=right data-sort-value="0.75" | 750 m || 
|-id=314 bgcolor=#fefefe
| 540314 ||  || — || October 9, 2010 || Mount Lemmon || Mount Lemmon Survey ||  || align=right data-sort-value="0.62" | 620 m || 
|-id=315 bgcolor=#E9E9E9
| 540315 ||  || — || January 17, 2015 || Haleakala || Pan-STARRS ||  || align=right | 1.3 km || 
|-id=316 bgcolor=#d6d6d6
| 540316 ||  || — || December 22, 2008 || Mount Lemmon || Mount Lemmon Survey ||  || align=right | 2.9 km || 
|-id=317 bgcolor=#E9E9E9
| 540317 ||  || — || September 3, 2008 || Kitt Peak || Spacewatch ||  || align=right | 1.9 km || 
|-id=318 bgcolor=#E9E9E9
| 540318 ||  || — || October 7, 2004 || Kitt Peak || Spacewatch ||  || align=right | 1.4 km || 
|-id=319 bgcolor=#fefefe
| 540319 ||  || — || September 25, 2006 || Kitt Peak || Spacewatch ||  || align=right data-sort-value="0.85" | 850 m || 
|-id=320 bgcolor=#fefefe
| 540320 ||  || — || September 19, 2006 || Kitt Peak || Spacewatch ||  || align=right data-sort-value="0.56" | 560 m || 
|-id=321 bgcolor=#d6d6d6
| 540321 ||  || — || November 26, 2003 || Kitt Peak || Spacewatch ||  || align=right | 2.2 km || 
|-id=322 bgcolor=#E9E9E9
| 540322 ||  || — || October 29, 2008 || Mount Lemmon || Mount Lemmon Survey ||  || align=right | 1.6 km || 
|-id=323 bgcolor=#E9E9E9
| 540323 ||  || — || October 27, 2005 || Kitt Peak || Spacewatch ||  || align=right | 2.1 km || 
|-id=324 bgcolor=#E9E9E9
| 540324 ||  || — || January 27, 2007 || Mount Lemmon || Mount Lemmon Survey ||  || align=right data-sort-value="0.98" | 980 m || 
|-id=325 bgcolor=#d6d6d6
| 540325 ||  || — || February 9, 2005 || Mount Lemmon || Mount Lemmon Survey ||  || align=right | 2.2 km || 
|-id=326 bgcolor=#E9E9E9
| 540326 ||  || — || September 24, 2008 || Kitt Peak || Spacewatch ||  || align=right | 2.7 km || 
|-id=327 bgcolor=#d6d6d6
| 540327 ||  || — || February 1, 2009 || Mount Lemmon || Mount Lemmon Survey ||  || align=right | 3.1 km || 
|-id=328 bgcolor=#E9E9E9
| 540328 ||  || — || October 22, 2005 || Kitt Peak || Spacewatch ||  || align=right data-sort-value="0.76" | 760 m || 
|-id=329 bgcolor=#E9E9E9
| 540329 ||  || — || November 23, 2009 || Mount Lemmon || Mount Lemmon Survey ||  || align=right | 1.3 km || 
|-id=330 bgcolor=#E9E9E9
| 540330 ||  || — || September 6, 2008 || Mount Lemmon || Mount Lemmon Survey ||  || align=right | 1.8 km || 
|-id=331 bgcolor=#fefefe
| 540331 ||  || — || January 19, 2005 || Kitt Peak || Spacewatch ||  || align=right data-sort-value="0.68" | 680 m || 
|-id=332 bgcolor=#d6d6d6
| 540332 ||  || — || June 17, 2005 || Mount Lemmon || Mount Lemmon Survey ||  || align=right | 2.8 km || 
|-id=333 bgcolor=#E9E9E9
| 540333 ||  || — || March 25, 2007 || Mount Lemmon || Mount Lemmon Survey ||  || align=right | 1.0 km || 
|-id=334 bgcolor=#fefefe
| 540334 ||  || — || April 12, 2004 || Kitt Peak || Spacewatch ||  || align=right data-sort-value="0.83" | 830 m || 
|-id=335 bgcolor=#fefefe
| 540335 ||  || — || November 14, 2006 || Kitt Peak || Spacewatch ||  || align=right data-sort-value="0.87" | 870 m || 
|-id=336 bgcolor=#E9E9E9
| 540336 ||  || — || November 25, 2005 || Mount Lemmon || Mount Lemmon Survey ||  || align=right | 1.4 km || 
|-id=337 bgcolor=#E9E9E9
| 540337 ||  || — || November 20, 2009 || Kitt Peak || Spacewatch ||  || align=right | 1.3 km || 
|-id=338 bgcolor=#d6d6d6
| 540338 ||  || — || November 4, 2007 || Kitt Peak || Spacewatch ||  || align=right | 2.4 km || 
|-id=339 bgcolor=#E9E9E9
| 540339 ||  || — || October 24, 2009 || Kitt Peak || Spacewatch ||  || align=right data-sort-value="0.85" | 850 m || 
|-id=340 bgcolor=#d6d6d6
| 540340 ||  || — || December 18, 2007 || Mount Lemmon || Mount Lemmon Survey ||  || align=right | 2.7 km || 
|-id=341 bgcolor=#d6d6d6
| 540341 ||  || — || October 17, 2006 || Kitt Peak || Spacewatch ||  || align=right | 3.4 km || 
|-id=342 bgcolor=#d6d6d6
| 540342 ||  || — || August 13, 2012 || Kitt Peak || Spacewatch ||  || align=right | 2.5 km || 
|-id=343 bgcolor=#d6d6d6
| 540343 ||  || — || September 12, 2007 || Mount Lemmon || Mount Lemmon Survey ||  || align=right | 2.0 km || 
|-id=344 bgcolor=#E9E9E9
| 540344 ||  || — || February 22, 2007 || Kitt Peak || Spacewatch ||  || align=right data-sort-value="0.77" | 770 m || 
|-id=345 bgcolor=#E9E9E9
| 540345 ||  || — || October 28, 2013 || Mount Lemmon || Mount Lemmon Survey ||  || align=right | 1.5 km || 
|-id=346 bgcolor=#E9E9E9
| 540346 ||  || — || October 25, 2013 || Kitt Peak || Spacewatch ||  || align=right | 1.1 km || 
|-id=347 bgcolor=#fefefe
| 540347 ||  || — || October 6, 1999 || Socorro || LINEAR || H || align=right data-sort-value="0.72" | 720 m || 
|-id=348 bgcolor=#d6d6d6
| 540348 ||  || — || February 26, 2008 || Mount Lemmon || Mount Lemmon Survey ||  || align=right | 2.0 km || 
|-id=349 bgcolor=#d6d6d6
| 540349 ||  || — || November 1, 2007 || Kitt Peak || Spacewatch ||  || align=right | 2.2 km || 
|-id=350 bgcolor=#E9E9E9
| 540350 ||  || — || October 20, 2004 || Catalina || CSS ||  || align=right | 1.9 km || 
|-id=351 bgcolor=#fefefe
| 540351 ||  || — || January 30, 2011 || Mount Lemmon || Mount Lemmon Survey ||  || align=right data-sort-value="0.95" | 950 m || 
|-id=352 bgcolor=#fefefe
| 540352 ||  || — || April 26, 2011 || Kitt Peak || Spacewatch || H || align=right data-sort-value="0.71" | 710 m || 
|-id=353 bgcolor=#fefefe
| 540353 ||  || — || June 16, 2009 || Mount Lemmon || Mount Lemmon Survey || H || align=right data-sort-value="0.90" | 900 m || 
|-id=354 bgcolor=#fefefe
| 540354 ||  || — || March 29, 2011 || Mount Lemmon || Mount Lemmon Survey || H || align=right data-sort-value="0.49" | 490 m || 
|-id=355 bgcolor=#E9E9E9
| 540355 ||  || — || September 5, 2008 || Kitt Peak || Spacewatch ||  || align=right | 2.0 km || 
|-id=356 bgcolor=#d6d6d6
| 540356 ||  || — || October 7, 2012 || Haleakala || Pan-STARRS ||  || align=right | 2.5 km || 
|-id=357 bgcolor=#E9E9E9
| 540357 ||  || — || October 17, 2003 || Anderson Mesa || LONEOS ||  || align=right | 2.3 km || 
|-id=358 bgcolor=#fefefe
| 540358 ||  || — || September 17, 2010 || Mount Lemmon || Mount Lemmon Survey ||  || align=right data-sort-value="0.65" | 650 m || 
|-id=359 bgcolor=#fefefe
| 540359 ||  || — || November 17, 2014 || Mount Lemmon || Mount Lemmon Survey ||  || align=right data-sort-value="0.57" | 570 m || 
|-id=360 bgcolor=#fefefe
| 540360 ||  || — || December 26, 2014 || Haleakala || Pan-STARRS ||  || align=right data-sort-value="0.74" | 740 m || 
|-id=361 bgcolor=#E9E9E9
| 540361 ||  || — || December 1, 2014 || Haleakala || Pan-STARRS ||  || align=right | 1.2 km || 
|-id=362 bgcolor=#d6d6d6
| 540362 ||  || — || September 15, 2012 || Mount Lemmon || Mount Lemmon Survey ||  || align=right | 2.2 km || 
|-id=363 bgcolor=#d6d6d6
| 540363 ||  || — || October 20, 2012 || Haleakala || Pan-STARRS ||  || align=right | 2.3 km || 
|-id=364 bgcolor=#d6d6d6
| 540364 ||  || — || September 3, 2007 || Catalina || CSS ||  || align=right | 2.5 km || 
|-id=365 bgcolor=#d6d6d6
| 540365 ||  || — || October 21, 2012 || Haleakala || Pan-STARRS ||  || align=right | 1.9 km || 
|-id=366 bgcolor=#fefefe
| 540366 ||  || — || November 20, 2007 || Mount Lemmon || Mount Lemmon Survey ||  || align=right data-sort-value="0.76" | 760 m || 
|-id=367 bgcolor=#d6d6d6
| 540367 ||  || — || November 20, 2008 || Kitt Peak || Spacewatch ||  || align=right | 1.8 km || 
|-id=368 bgcolor=#d6d6d6
| 540368 ||  || — || November 14, 2007 || Mount Lemmon || Mount Lemmon Survey ||  || align=right | 2.2 km || 
|-id=369 bgcolor=#E9E9E9
| 540369 ||  || — || September 14, 2013 || Mount Lemmon || Mount Lemmon Survey ||  || align=right | 1.8 km || 
|-id=370 bgcolor=#E9E9E9
| 540370 ||  || — || January 13, 2015 || Haleakala || Pan-STARRS ||  || align=right | 1.1 km || 
|-id=371 bgcolor=#E9E9E9
| 540371 ||  || — || July 13, 2013 || Haleakala || Pan-STARRS ||  || align=right | 1.5 km || 
|-id=372 bgcolor=#d6d6d6
| 540372 ||  || — || January 28, 2009 || Kitt Peak || Spacewatch ||  || align=right | 2.7 km || 
|-id=373 bgcolor=#d6d6d6
| 540373 ||  || — || February 28, 2009 || Mount Lemmon || Mount Lemmon Survey ||  || align=right | 3.1 km || 
|-id=374 bgcolor=#E9E9E9
| 540374 ||  || — || October 13, 2013 || Catalina || CSS ||  || align=right | 1.1 km || 
|-id=375 bgcolor=#fefefe
| 540375 ||  || — || September 5, 2010 || Mount Lemmon || Mount Lemmon Survey ||  || align=right data-sort-value="0.67" | 670 m || 
|-id=376 bgcolor=#d6d6d6
| 540376 ||  || — || October 21, 2007 || Mount Lemmon || Mount Lemmon Survey ||  || align=right | 2.2 km || 
|-id=377 bgcolor=#E9E9E9
| 540377 ||  || — || January 21, 2015 || Haleakala || Pan-STARRS ||  || align=right | 1.2 km || 
|-id=378 bgcolor=#d6d6d6
| 540378 ||  || — || August 29, 2006 || Kitt Peak || Spacewatch ||  || align=right | 2.2 km || 
|-id=379 bgcolor=#E9E9E9
| 540379 ||  || — || November 30, 2005 || Mount Lemmon || Mount Lemmon Survey ||  || align=right | 1.3 km || 
|-id=380 bgcolor=#E9E9E9
| 540380 ||  || — || September 15, 2013 || Catalina || CSS ||  || align=right | 1.2 km || 
|-id=381 bgcolor=#d6d6d6
| 540381 ||  || — || October 13, 2007 || Catalina || CSS ||  || align=right | 2.4 km || 
|-id=382 bgcolor=#E9E9E9
| 540382 ||  || — || November 21, 2009 || Kitt Peak || Spacewatch ||  || align=right | 1.2 km || 
|-id=383 bgcolor=#d6d6d6
| 540383 ||  || — || March 15, 2009 || Kitt Peak || Spacewatch ||  || align=right | 4.1 km || 
|-id=384 bgcolor=#d6d6d6
| 540384 ||  || — || December 22, 2008 || Kitt Peak || Spacewatch ||  || align=right | 3.2 km || 
|-id=385 bgcolor=#d6d6d6
| 540385 ||  || — || December 27, 2003 || Kitt Peak || Spacewatch ||  || align=right | 3.6 km || 
|-id=386 bgcolor=#E9E9E9
| 540386 ||  || — || January 9, 2006 || Mount Lemmon || Mount Lemmon Survey ||  || align=right | 2.7 km || 
|-id=387 bgcolor=#fefefe
| 540387 ||  || — || October 4, 2002 || Socorro || LINEAR ||  || align=right data-sort-value="0.85" | 850 m || 
|-id=388 bgcolor=#E9E9E9
| 540388 ||  || — || September 3, 2008 || Kitt Peak || Spacewatch ||  || align=right | 2.1 km || 
|-id=389 bgcolor=#E9E9E9
| 540389 ||  || — || February 10, 2010 || Kitt Peak || Spacewatch ||  || align=right | 1.9 km || 
|-id=390 bgcolor=#E9E9E9
| 540390 ||  || — || September 18, 2009 || Kitt Peak || Spacewatch ||  || align=right data-sort-value="0.71" | 710 m || 
|-id=391 bgcolor=#E9E9E9
| 540391 ||  || — || January 26, 2006 || Kitt Peak || Spacewatch ||  || align=right | 1.8 km || 
|-id=392 bgcolor=#d6d6d6
| 540392 ||  || — || March 1, 2008 || Kitt Peak || Spacewatch || 7:4 || align=right | 3.2 km || 
|-id=393 bgcolor=#fefefe
| 540393 ||  || — || October 11, 2006 || Kitt Peak || Spacewatch ||  || align=right data-sort-value="0.74" | 740 m || 
|-id=394 bgcolor=#E9E9E9
| 540394 ||  || — || March 5, 2006 || Kitt Peak || Spacewatch ||  || align=right | 1.4 km || 
|-id=395 bgcolor=#fefefe
| 540395 ||  || — || February 27, 2012 || Haleakala || Pan-STARRS ||  || align=right data-sort-value="0.70" | 700 m || 
|-id=396 bgcolor=#E9E9E9
| 540396 ||  || — || September 23, 2008 || Kitt Peak || Spacewatch ||  || align=right | 1.7 km || 
|-id=397 bgcolor=#E9E9E9
| 540397 ||  || — || September 14, 2013 || Kitt Peak || Spacewatch ||  || align=right data-sort-value="0.80" | 800 m || 
|-id=398 bgcolor=#d6d6d6
| 540398 ||  || — || October 18, 2012 || Mount Lemmon || Mount Lemmon Survey ||  || align=right | 2.3 km || 
|-id=399 bgcolor=#d6d6d6
| 540399 ||  || — || October 9, 2007 || Kitt Peak || Spacewatch ||  || align=right | 2.6 km || 
|-id=400 bgcolor=#fefefe
| 540400 ||  || — || September 9, 2010 || La Sagra || OAM Obs. ||  || align=right data-sort-value="0.86" | 860 m || 
|}

540401–540500 

|-bgcolor=#fefefe
| 540401 ||  || — || October 17, 2010 || Mount Lemmon || Mount Lemmon Survey ||  || align=right data-sort-value="0.67" | 670 m || 
|-id=402 bgcolor=#fefefe
| 540402 ||  || — || August 13, 2010 || Kitt Peak || Spacewatch ||  || align=right data-sort-value="0.78" | 780 m || 
|-id=403 bgcolor=#fefefe
| 540403 ||  || — || November 19, 2003 || Kitt Peak || Spacewatch ||  || align=right | 1.1 km || 
|-id=404 bgcolor=#fefefe
| 540404 ||  || — || February 29, 2012 || Mount Lemmon || Mount Lemmon Survey ||  || align=right data-sort-value="0.65" | 650 m || 
|-id=405 bgcolor=#fefefe
| 540405 ||  || — || August 17, 2009 || Kitt Peak || Spacewatch ||  || align=right | 1.0 km || 
|-id=406 bgcolor=#E9E9E9
| 540406 ||  || — || March 31, 2011 || Haleakala || Pan-STARRS ||  || align=right | 1.5 km || 
|-id=407 bgcolor=#d6d6d6
| 540407 ||  || — || October 19, 2006 || Kitt Peak || Spacewatch ||  || align=right | 2.6 km || 
|-id=408 bgcolor=#fefefe
| 540408 ||  || — || February 18, 2008 || Mount Lemmon || Mount Lemmon Survey || H || align=right data-sort-value="0.64" | 640 m || 
|-id=409 bgcolor=#E9E9E9
| 540409 ||  || — || November 10, 2009 || Kitt Peak || Spacewatch ||  || align=right | 1.5 km || 
|-id=410 bgcolor=#d6d6d6
| 540410 ||  || — || October 18, 2012 || Haleakala || Pan-STARRS ||  || align=right | 2.2 km || 
|-id=411 bgcolor=#E9E9E9
| 540411 ||  || — || January 13, 2005 || Kitt Peak || Spacewatch ||  || align=right | 2.0 km || 
|-id=412 bgcolor=#E9E9E9
| 540412 ||  || — || November 8, 2009 || Mount Lemmon || Mount Lemmon Survey ||  || align=right data-sort-value="0.87" | 870 m || 
|-id=413 bgcolor=#E9E9E9
| 540413 Nikzad ||  ||  || February 2, 2010 || WISE || WISE ||  || align=right | 1.9 km || 
|-id=414 bgcolor=#E9E9E9
| 540414 ||  || — || November 12, 2013 || Kitt Peak || Spacewatch ||  || align=right | 1.3 km || 
|-id=415 bgcolor=#fefefe
| 540415 ||  || — || March 3, 2008 || Mount Lemmon || Mount Lemmon Survey ||  || align=right data-sort-value="0.98" | 980 m || 
|-id=416 bgcolor=#E9E9E9
| 540416 ||  || — || December 10, 2009 || Mount Lemmon || Mount Lemmon Survey ||  || align=right | 1.3 km || 
|-id=417 bgcolor=#fefefe
| 540417 ||  || — || May 29, 2009 || Mount Lemmon || Mount Lemmon Survey ||  || align=right data-sort-value="0.83" | 830 m || 
|-id=418 bgcolor=#E9E9E9
| 540418 ||  || — || February 3, 2001 || Kitt Peak || Spacewatch ||  || align=right | 2.0 km || 
|-id=419 bgcolor=#E9E9E9
| 540419 ||  || — || April 23, 2011 || Haleakala || Pan-STARRS ||  || align=right | 2.4 km || 
|-id=420 bgcolor=#E9E9E9
| 540420 ||  || — || January 7, 2006 || Mount Lemmon || Mount Lemmon Survey ||  || align=right | 1.3 km || 
|-id=421 bgcolor=#fefefe
| 540421 ||  || — || November 21, 2014 || Haleakala || Pan-STARRS ||  || align=right data-sort-value="0.69" | 690 m || 
|-id=422 bgcolor=#fefefe
| 540422 ||  || — || November 6, 2010 || Mount Lemmon || Mount Lemmon Survey ||  || align=right data-sort-value="0.80" | 800 m || 
|-id=423 bgcolor=#d6d6d6
| 540423 ||  || — || January 30, 2008 || Mount Lemmon || Mount Lemmon Survey ||  || align=right | 2.9 km || 
|-id=424 bgcolor=#E9E9E9
| 540424 ||  || — || May 15, 2012 || Haleakala || Pan-STARRS ||  || align=right | 1.4 km || 
|-id=425 bgcolor=#E9E9E9
| 540425 ||  || — || October 8, 2004 || Kitt Peak || Spacewatch ||  || align=right | 1.6 km || 
|-id=426 bgcolor=#d6d6d6
| 540426 ||  || — || September 22, 2003 || Kitt Peak || Spacewatch ||  || align=right | 2.5 km || 
|-id=427 bgcolor=#d6d6d6
| 540427 ||  || — || February 28, 2009 || Mount Lemmon || Mount Lemmon Survey ||  || align=right | 2.3 km || 
|-id=428 bgcolor=#d6d6d6
| 540428 ||  || — || March 17, 2004 || Kitt Peak || Spacewatch ||  || align=right | 2.5 km || 
|-id=429 bgcolor=#d6d6d6
| 540429 ||  || — || October 11, 2007 || Kitt Peak || Spacewatch ||  || align=right | 2.4 km || 
|-id=430 bgcolor=#E9E9E9
| 540430 ||  || — || January 31, 2006 || Kitt Peak || Spacewatch ||  || align=right | 1.7 km || 
|-id=431 bgcolor=#d6d6d6
| 540431 ||  || — || November 24, 2008 || Kitt Peak || Spacewatch ||  || align=right | 1.6 km || 
|-id=432 bgcolor=#E9E9E9
| 540432 ||  || — || October 28, 1997 || Kitt Peak || Spacewatch ||  || align=right data-sort-value="0.82" | 820 m || 
|-id=433 bgcolor=#fefefe
| 540433 ||  || — || January 20, 2002 || Kitt Peak || Spacewatch ||  || align=right data-sort-value="0.58" | 580 m || 
|-id=434 bgcolor=#E9E9E9
| 540434 ||  || — || November 22, 2009 || Mount Lemmon || Mount Lemmon Survey ||  || align=right | 1.2 km || 
|-id=435 bgcolor=#d6d6d6
| 540435 ||  || — || October 19, 2010 || Mount Lemmon || Mount Lemmon Survey || 3:2 || align=right | 3.7 km || 
|-id=436 bgcolor=#fefefe
| 540436 ||  || — || February 25, 2006 || Kitt Peak || Spacewatch ||  || align=right data-sort-value="0.68" | 680 m || 
|-id=437 bgcolor=#E9E9E9
| 540437 ||  || — || September 21, 2008 || Mount Lemmon || Mount Lemmon Survey ||  || align=right | 1.9 km || 
|-id=438 bgcolor=#E9E9E9
| 540438 ||  || — || October 2, 2000 || Kitt Peak || Spacewatch ||  || align=right | 1.3 km || 
|-id=439 bgcolor=#fefefe
| 540439 ||  || — || September 2, 2010 || Mount Lemmon || Mount Lemmon Survey ||  || align=right data-sort-value="0.57" | 570 m || 
|-id=440 bgcolor=#d6d6d6
| 540440 ||  || — || March 17, 2005 || Kitt Peak || Spacewatch ||  || align=right | 2.5 km || 
|-id=441 bgcolor=#d6d6d6
| 540441 ||  || — || January 28, 2003 || Kitt Peak || Spacewatch ||  || align=right | 3.3 km || 
|-id=442 bgcolor=#d6d6d6
| 540442 ||  || — || January 1, 2008 || Mount Lemmon || Mount Lemmon Survey ||  || align=right | 2.0 km || 
|-id=443 bgcolor=#fefefe
| 540443 ||  || — || March 3, 2005 || Kitt Peak || Spacewatch ||  || align=right data-sort-value="0.68" | 680 m || 
|-id=444 bgcolor=#d6d6d6
| 540444 ||  || — || October 21, 2006 || Kitt Peak || Spacewatch ||  || align=right | 2.7 km || 
|-id=445 bgcolor=#E9E9E9
| 540445 ||  || — || February 16, 2015 || Haleakala || Pan-STARRS ||  || align=right | 1.3 km || 
|-id=446 bgcolor=#d6d6d6
| 540446 ||  || — || August 28, 2006 || Siding Spring || SSS ||  || align=right | 3.0 km || 
|-id=447 bgcolor=#d6d6d6
| 540447 ||  || — || November 20, 2012 || Catalina || CSS ||  || align=right | 3.2 km || 
|-id=448 bgcolor=#E9E9E9
| 540448 ||  || — || January 30, 2011 || Haleakala || Pan-STARRS ||  || align=right | 1.7 km || 
|-id=449 bgcolor=#d6d6d6
| 540449 ||  || — || October 6, 2012 || Kitt Peak || Spacewatch ||  || align=right | 3.3 km || 
|-id=450 bgcolor=#E9E9E9
| 540450 ||  || — || September 24, 2008 || Mount Lemmon || Mount Lemmon Survey ||  || align=right | 2.4 km || 
|-id=451 bgcolor=#E9E9E9
| 540451 ||  || — || January 31, 2006 || Kitt Peak || Spacewatch ||  || align=right | 1.9 km || 
|-id=452 bgcolor=#d6d6d6
| 540452 ||  || — || February 5, 2009 || Kitt Peak || Spacewatch ||  || align=right | 2.0 km || 
|-id=453 bgcolor=#E9E9E9
| 540453 ||  || — || October 20, 2008 || Mount Lemmon || Mount Lemmon Survey ||  || align=right | 1.7 km || 
|-id=454 bgcolor=#fefefe
| 540454 ||  || — || January 18, 2012 || Mount Lemmon || Mount Lemmon Survey ||  || align=right data-sort-value="0.50" | 500 m || 
|-id=455 bgcolor=#d6d6d6
| 540455 ||  || — || August 19, 2006 || Kitt Peak || Spacewatch ||  || align=right | 2.1 km || 
|-id=456 bgcolor=#E9E9E9
| 540456 ||  || — || October 7, 2004 || Socorro || LINEAR ||  || align=right | 1.5 km || 
|-id=457 bgcolor=#fefefe
| 540457 ||  || — || January 5, 2006 || Kitt Peak || Spacewatch ||  || align=right data-sort-value="0.58" | 580 m || 
|-id=458 bgcolor=#E9E9E9
| 540458 ||  || — || January 29, 2007 || Kitt Peak || Spacewatch ||  || align=right | 1.9 km || 
|-id=459 bgcolor=#d6d6d6
| 540459 ||  || — || August 24, 2007 || Kitt Peak || Spacewatch ||  || align=right | 1.9 km || 
|-id=460 bgcolor=#d6d6d6
| 540460 ||  || — || January 26, 2010 || WISE || WISE ||  || align=right | 2.8 km || 
|-id=461 bgcolor=#fefefe
| 540461 ||  || — || December 1, 2008 || Kitt Peak || Spacewatch ||  || align=right data-sort-value="0.58" | 580 m || 
|-id=462 bgcolor=#fefefe
| 540462 ||  || — || December 5, 2007 || Kitt Peak || Spacewatch ||  || align=right data-sort-value="0.53" | 530 m || 
|-id=463 bgcolor=#E9E9E9
| 540463 ||  || — || February 2, 2006 || Mount Lemmon || Mount Lemmon Survey ||  || align=right | 1.3 km || 
|-id=464 bgcolor=#E9E9E9
| 540464 ||  || — || September 17, 2004 || Kitt Peak || Spacewatch ||  || align=right | 1.6 km || 
|-id=465 bgcolor=#E9E9E9
| 540465 ||  || — || January 15, 2005 || Kitt Peak || Spacewatch ||  || align=right | 1.8 km || 
|-id=466 bgcolor=#E9E9E9
| 540466 ||  || — || October 20, 2008 || Kitt Peak || Spacewatch ||  || align=right | 2.0 km || 
|-id=467 bgcolor=#fefefe
| 540467 ||  || — || January 24, 2007 || Kitt Peak || Spacewatch ||  || align=right data-sort-value="0.63" | 630 m || 
|-id=468 bgcolor=#d6d6d6
| 540468 ||  || — || September 13, 2007 || Mount Lemmon || Mount Lemmon Survey ||  || align=right | 2.4 km || 
|-id=469 bgcolor=#E9E9E9
| 540469 ||  || — || October 26, 2009 || Kitt Peak || Spacewatch ||  || align=right data-sort-value="0.83" | 830 m || 
|-id=470 bgcolor=#d6d6d6
| 540470 ||  || — || December 18, 2001 || Socorro || LINEAR ||  || align=right | 2.2 km || 
|-id=471 bgcolor=#E9E9E9
| 540471 ||  || — || October 1, 2008 || Kitt Peak || Spacewatch ||  || align=right | 1.8 km || 
|-id=472 bgcolor=#E9E9E9
| 540472 ||  || — || October 23, 2008 || Kitt Peak || Spacewatch ||  || align=right | 2.2 km || 
|-id=473 bgcolor=#E9E9E9
| 540473 ||  || — || November 22, 2009 || Mount Lemmon || Mount Lemmon Survey ||  || align=right data-sort-value="0.72" | 720 m || 
|-id=474 bgcolor=#E9E9E9
| 540474 ||  || — || October 7, 2004 || Socorro || LINEAR ||  || align=right | 1.6 km || 
|-id=475 bgcolor=#E9E9E9
| 540475 ||  || — || October 15, 2004 || Mount Lemmon || Mount Lemmon Survey ||  || align=right | 1.6 km || 
|-id=476 bgcolor=#E9E9E9
| 540476 ||  || — || October 8, 2008 || Kitt Peak || Spacewatch ||  || align=right | 1.8 km || 
|-id=477 bgcolor=#E9E9E9
| 540477 ||  || — || March 14, 2007 || Mount Lemmon || Mount Lemmon Survey ||  || align=right | 1.8 km || 
|-id=478 bgcolor=#d6d6d6
| 540478 ||  || — || April 17, 2009 || Kitt Peak || Spacewatch ||  || align=right | 3.2 km || 
|-id=479 bgcolor=#E9E9E9
| 540479 ||  || — || January 7, 2006 || Mount Lemmon || Mount Lemmon Survey ||  || align=right | 1.2 km || 
|-id=480 bgcolor=#fefefe
| 540480 ||  || — || April 4, 2003 || Kitt Peak || Spacewatch ||  || align=right data-sort-value="0.62" | 620 m || 
|-id=481 bgcolor=#fefefe
| 540481 ||  || — || August 9, 2013 || Haleakala || Pan-STARRS ||  || align=right data-sort-value="0.80" | 800 m || 
|-id=482 bgcolor=#E9E9E9
| 540482 ||  || — || September 20, 2000 || Kitt Peak || Spacewatch ||  || align=right | 1.4 km || 
|-id=483 bgcolor=#d6d6d6
| 540483 ||  || — || September 30, 2007 || Kitt Peak || Spacewatch ||  || align=right | 2.1 km || 
|-id=484 bgcolor=#E9E9E9
| 540484 ||  || — || November 18, 2000 || Kitt Peak || Spacewatch ||  || align=right | 1.6 km || 
|-id=485 bgcolor=#fefefe
| 540485 ||  || — || November 27, 2006 || Kitt Peak || Spacewatch ||  || align=right data-sort-value="0.84" | 840 m || 
|-id=486 bgcolor=#E9E9E9
| 540486 ||  || — || March 2, 2011 || Mount Lemmon || Mount Lemmon Survey ||  || align=right | 1.4 km || 
|-id=487 bgcolor=#fefefe
| 540487 ||  || — || October 13, 2010 || Mount Lemmon || Mount Lemmon Survey ||  || align=right data-sort-value="0.62" | 620 m || 
|-id=488 bgcolor=#E9E9E9
| 540488 ||  || — || September 26, 2008 || Mount Lemmon || Mount Lemmon Survey ||  || align=right | 1.7 km || 
|-id=489 bgcolor=#d6d6d6
| 540489 ||  || — || December 21, 2007 || Mount Lemmon || Mount Lemmon Survey ||  || align=right | 3.0 km || 
|-id=490 bgcolor=#E9E9E9
| 540490 ||  || — || September 23, 2008 || Kitt Peak || Spacewatch ||  || align=right | 1.5 km || 
|-id=491 bgcolor=#fefefe
| 540491 ||  || — || July 2, 2013 || Haleakala || Pan-STARRS ||  || align=right data-sort-value="0.85" | 850 m || 
|-id=492 bgcolor=#E9E9E9
| 540492 ||  || — || October 24, 2013 || Catalina || CSS ||  || align=right | 1.4 km || 
|-id=493 bgcolor=#E9E9E9
| 540493 ||  || — || December 25, 2005 || Kitt Peak || Spacewatch ||  || align=right | 1.3 km || 
|-id=494 bgcolor=#fefefe
| 540494 ||  || — || August 28, 2013 || Catalina || CSS ||  || align=right data-sort-value="0.91" | 910 m || 
|-id=495 bgcolor=#d6d6d6
| 540495 ||  || — || April 12, 2004 || Kitt Peak || Spacewatch ||  || align=right | 3.2 km || 
|-id=496 bgcolor=#E9E9E9
| 540496 ||  || — || September 15, 2004 || Kitt Peak || Spacewatch ||  || align=right | 1.4 km || 
|-id=497 bgcolor=#E9E9E9
| 540497 ||  || — || September 13, 2005 || Kitt Peak || Spacewatch ||  || align=right data-sort-value="0.80" | 800 m || 
|-id=498 bgcolor=#E9E9E9
| 540498 ||  || — || April 2, 2006 || Kitt Peak || Spacewatch ||  || align=right | 1.8 km || 
|-id=499 bgcolor=#E9E9E9
| 540499 ||  || — || November 20, 2009 || Mount Lemmon || Mount Lemmon Survey ||  || align=right | 1.1 km || 
|-id=500 bgcolor=#E9E9E9
| 540500 ||  || — || October 2, 2008 || Kitt Peak || Spacewatch ||  || align=right | 1.8 km || 
|}

540501–540600 

|-bgcolor=#E9E9E9
| 540501 ||  || — || October 4, 2004 || Kitt Peak || Spacewatch ||  || align=right | 1.0 km || 
|-id=502 bgcolor=#d6d6d6
| 540502 ||  || — || February 2, 2009 || Mount Lemmon || Mount Lemmon Survey ||  || align=right | 2.1 km || 
|-id=503 bgcolor=#E9E9E9
| 540503 ||  || — || November 10, 2013 || Mount Lemmon || Mount Lemmon Survey ||  || align=right | 1.4 km || 
|-id=504 bgcolor=#E9E9E9
| 540504 ||  || — || February 14, 2010 || Mount Lemmon || Mount Lemmon Survey ||  || align=right | 2.1 km || 
|-id=505 bgcolor=#E9E9E9
| 540505 ||  || — || October 9, 2013 || Mount Lemmon || Mount Lemmon Survey ||  || align=right | 1.9 km || 
|-id=506 bgcolor=#E9E9E9
| 540506 ||  || — || October 6, 2008 || Mount Lemmon || Mount Lemmon Survey ||  || align=right | 1.8 km || 
|-id=507 bgcolor=#E9E9E9
| 540507 ||  || — || April 9, 2010 || WISE || WISE ||  || align=right | 3.5 km || 
|-id=508 bgcolor=#d6d6d6
| 540508 ||  || — || January 11, 2008 || Kitt Peak || Spacewatch ||  || align=right | 2.0 km || 
|-id=509 bgcolor=#E9E9E9
| 540509 ||  || — || October 30, 2009 || Mount Lemmon || Mount Lemmon Survey ||  || align=right data-sort-value="0.97" | 970 m || 
|-id=510 bgcolor=#E9E9E9
| 540510 ||  || — || September 23, 2008 || Kitt Peak || Spacewatch ||  || align=right | 2.2 km || 
|-id=511 bgcolor=#d6d6d6
| 540511 ||  || — || September 10, 2007 || Kitt Peak || Spacewatch ||  || align=right | 2.9 km || 
|-id=512 bgcolor=#d6d6d6
| 540512 ||  || — || November 30, 2003 || Kitt Peak || Spacewatch ||  || align=right | 2.0 km || 
|-id=513 bgcolor=#E9E9E9
| 540513 ||  || — || November 17, 2001 || Kitt Peak || Spacewatch ||  || align=right | 1.2 km || 
|-id=514 bgcolor=#fefefe
| 540514 ||  || — || February 26, 2012 || Haleakala || Pan-STARRS ||  || align=right data-sort-value="0.60" | 600 m || 
|-id=515 bgcolor=#E9E9E9
| 540515 ||  || — || December 3, 2004 || Kitt Peak || Spacewatch ||  || align=right | 2.0 km || 
|-id=516 bgcolor=#E9E9E9
| 540516 ||  || — || October 21, 2008 || Mount Lemmon || Mount Lemmon Survey ||  || align=right | 1.6 km || 
|-id=517 bgcolor=#E9E9E9
| 540517 ||  || — || November 25, 2005 || Catalina || CSS ||  || align=right | 1.0 km || 
|-id=518 bgcolor=#E9E9E9
| 540518 ||  || — || December 4, 2005 || Kitt Peak || Spacewatch ||  || align=right | 1.3 km || 
|-id=519 bgcolor=#d6d6d6
| 540519 ||  || — || January 12, 2008 || Kitt Peak || Spacewatch ||  || align=right | 3.0 km || 
|-id=520 bgcolor=#d6d6d6
| 540520 ||  || — || October 6, 2012 || Haleakala || Pan-STARRS ||  || align=right | 2.5 km || 
|-id=521 bgcolor=#d6d6d6
| 540521 ||  || — || March 15, 2004 || Kitt Peak || Spacewatch ||  || align=right | 2.5 km || 
|-id=522 bgcolor=#fefefe
| 540522 ||  || — || October 19, 2006 || Kitt Peak || Spacewatch ||  || align=right data-sort-value="0.65" | 650 m || 
|-id=523 bgcolor=#d6d6d6
| 540523 ||  || — || April 26, 2006 || Kitt Peak || Spacewatch ||  || align=right | 2.6 km || 
|-id=524 bgcolor=#fefefe
| 540524 ||  || — || September 8, 2007 || Anderson Mesa || LONEOS ||  || align=right data-sort-value="0.85" | 850 m || 
|-id=525 bgcolor=#d6d6d6
| 540525 ||  || — || January 15, 2009 || Kitt Peak || Spacewatch ||  || align=right | 3.4 km || 
|-id=526 bgcolor=#E9E9E9
| 540526 ||  || — || November 18, 2009 || Kitt Peak || Spacewatch ||  || align=right data-sort-value="0.81" | 810 m || 
|-id=527 bgcolor=#E9E9E9
| 540527 ||  || — || September 9, 2008 || Catalina || CSS ||  || align=right | 2.4 km || 
|-id=528 bgcolor=#E9E9E9
| 540528 ||  || — || January 18, 2015 || Kitt Peak || Spacewatch ||  || align=right | 1.7 km || 
|-id=529 bgcolor=#E9E9E9
| 540529 ||  || — || October 22, 2008 || Kitt Peak || Spacewatch ||  || align=right | 2.1 km || 
|-id=530 bgcolor=#E9E9E9
| 540530 ||  || — || October 9, 2004 || Kitt Peak || Spacewatch ||  || align=right | 1.5 km || 
|-id=531 bgcolor=#d6d6d6
| 540531 ||  || — || October 1, 2000 || Socorro || LINEAR ||  || align=right | 4.2 km || 
|-id=532 bgcolor=#fefefe
| 540532 ||  || — || November 20, 2007 || Mount Lemmon || Mount Lemmon Survey ||  || align=right data-sort-value="0.89" | 890 m || 
|-id=533 bgcolor=#E9E9E9
| 540533 ||  || — || November 27, 2008 || La Sagra || OAM Obs. ||  || align=right | 2.4 km || 
|-id=534 bgcolor=#d6d6d6
| 540534 ||  || — || August 27, 2006 || Kitt Peak || Spacewatch ||  || align=right | 3.0 km || 
|-id=535 bgcolor=#E9E9E9
| 540535 ||  || — || August 21, 2004 || Siding Spring || SSS ||  || align=right | 1.5 km || 
|-id=536 bgcolor=#E9E9E9
| 540536 ||  || — || March 11, 2007 || Mount Lemmon || Mount Lemmon Survey ||  || align=right data-sort-value="0.81" | 810 m || 
|-id=537 bgcolor=#d6d6d6
| 540537 ||  || — || June 29, 2005 || Kitt Peak || Spacewatch ||  || align=right | 3.1 km || 
|-id=538 bgcolor=#d6d6d6
| 540538 ||  || — || October 21, 2006 || Kitt Peak || Spacewatch ||  || align=right | 3.6 km || 
|-id=539 bgcolor=#E9E9E9
| 540539 ||  || — || May 13, 2004 || Socorro || LINEAR ||  || align=right | 1.3 km || 
|-id=540 bgcolor=#d6d6d6
| 540540 ||  || — || November 19, 2007 || Mount Lemmon || Mount Lemmon Survey ||  || align=right | 2.9 km || 
|-id=541 bgcolor=#d6d6d6
| 540541 ||  || — || September 27, 2006 || Kitt Peak || Spacewatch ||  || align=right | 2.8 km || 
|-id=542 bgcolor=#d6d6d6
| 540542 ||  || — || June 27, 2011 || Kitt Peak || Spacewatch ||  || align=right | 2.9 km || 
|-id=543 bgcolor=#fefefe
| 540543 ||  || — || October 25, 2003 || Kitt Peak || Spacewatch ||  || align=right data-sort-value="0.81" | 810 m || 
|-id=544 bgcolor=#E9E9E9
| 540544 ||  || — || September 17, 1995 || Kitt Peak || Spacewatch ||  || align=right | 1.4 km || 
|-id=545 bgcolor=#d6d6d6
| 540545 ||  || — || November 11, 2006 || Kitt Peak || Spacewatch ||  || align=right | 3.0 km || 
|-id=546 bgcolor=#E9E9E9
| 540546 ||  || — || January 5, 2006 || Kitt Peak || Spacewatch ||  || align=right | 1.8 km || 
|-id=547 bgcolor=#E9E9E9
| 540547 ||  || — || May 21, 2006 || Mount Lemmon || Mount Lemmon Survey ||  || align=right | 2.2 km || 
|-id=548 bgcolor=#d6d6d6
| 540548 ||  || — || November 17, 2006 || Mount Lemmon || Mount Lemmon Survey ||  || align=right | 3.6 km || 
|-id=549 bgcolor=#E9E9E9
| 540549 ||  || — || October 1, 2003 || Kitt Peak || Spacewatch ||  || align=right | 2.2 km || 
|-id=550 bgcolor=#E9E9E9
| 540550 ||  || — || February 23, 2011 || Haleakala || Pan-STARRS ||  || align=right | 1.2 km || 
|-id=551 bgcolor=#E9E9E9
| 540551 ||  || — || February 20, 2006 || Kitt Peak || Spacewatch ||  || align=right | 2.5 km || 
|-id=552 bgcolor=#E9E9E9
| 540552 ||  || — || June 27, 2004 || Siding Spring || SSS ||  || align=right | 1.7 km || 
|-id=553 bgcolor=#fefefe
| 540553 ||  || — || January 3, 2009 || Kitt Peak || Spacewatch ||  || align=right data-sort-value="0.72" | 720 m || 
|-id=554 bgcolor=#fefefe
| 540554 ||  || — || January 26, 2006 || Kitt Peak || Spacewatch ||  || align=right data-sort-value="0.74" | 740 m || 
|-id=555 bgcolor=#d6d6d6
| 540555 ||  || — || November 7, 2012 || Kitt Peak || Spacewatch ||  || align=right | 3.1 km || 
|-id=556 bgcolor=#E9E9E9
| 540556 ||  || — || July 30, 2008 || Kitt Peak || Spacewatch ||  || align=right | 1.4 km || 
|-id=557 bgcolor=#d6d6d6
| 540557 ||  || — || February 9, 2014 || Kitt Peak || Spacewatch ||  || align=right | 2.6 km || 
|-id=558 bgcolor=#E9E9E9
| 540558 ||  || — || March 20, 2007 || Mount Lemmon || Mount Lemmon Survey ||  || align=right data-sort-value="0.94" | 940 m || 
|-id=559 bgcolor=#E9E9E9
| 540559 ||  || — || March 4, 2005 || Kitt Peak || Spacewatch ||  || align=right | 2.0 km || 
|-id=560 bgcolor=#E9E9E9
| 540560 ||  || — || April 29, 2011 || Mount Lemmon || Mount Lemmon Survey ||  || align=right | 1.9 km || 
|-id=561 bgcolor=#d6d6d6
| 540561 ||  || — || October 17, 2006 || Mount Lemmon || Mount Lemmon Survey ||  || align=right | 2.9 km || 
|-id=562 bgcolor=#fefefe
| 540562 ||  || — || January 31, 2008 || Mount Lemmon || Mount Lemmon Survey ||  || align=right data-sort-value="0.86" | 860 m || 
|-id=563 bgcolor=#d6d6d6
| 540563 ||  || — || February 1, 2009 || Kitt Peak || Spacewatch ||  || align=right | 2.6 km || 
|-id=564 bgcolor=#E9E9E9
| 540564 ||  || — || December 13, 1999 || Kitt Peak || Spacewatch ||  || align=right | 2.3 km || 
|-id=565 bgcolor=#d6d6d6
| 540565 ||  || — || November 18, 2006 || Mount Lemmon || Mount Lemmon Survey ||  || align=right | 2.5 km || 
|-id=566 bgcolor=#d6d6d6
| 540566 ||  || — || January 18, 2008 || Mount Lemmon || Mount Lemmon Survey ||  || align=right | 2.4 km || 
|-id=567 bgcolor=#d6d6d6
| 540567 ||  || — || January 30, 2009 || Mount Lemmon || Mount Lemmon Survey ||  || align=right | 2.3 km || 
|-id=568 bgcolor=#d6d6d6
| 540568 ||  || — || December 10, 2012 || Haleakala || Pan-STARRS ||  || align=right | 2.0 km || 
|-id=569 bgcolor=#E9E9E9
| 540569 ||  || — || September 3, 2008 || Kitt Peak || Spacewatch ||  || align=right | 2.0 km || 
|-id=570 bgcolor=#E9E9E9
| 540570 ||  || — || December 20, 2009 || Mount Lemmon || Mount Lemmon Survey ||  || align=right | 1.5 km || 
|-id=571 bgcolor=#d6d6d6
| 540571 ||  || — || March 9, 2008 || Mount Lemmon || Mount Lemmon Survey ||  || align=right | 2.3 km || 
|-id=572 bgcolor=#d6d6d6
| 540572 ||  || — || September 30, 2006 || Mount Lemmon || Mount Lemmon Survey ||  || align=right | 3.5 km || 
|-id=573 bgcolor=#E9E9E9
| 540573 ||  || — || October 9, 2005 || Kitt Peak || Spacewatch ||  || align=right data-sort-value="0.98" | 980 m || 
|-id=574 bgcolor=#E9E9E9
| 540574 ||  || — || April 20, 2006 || Kitt Peak || Spacewatch ||  || align=right | 2.3 km || 
|-id=575 bgcolor=#E9E9E9
| 540575 ||  || — || February 8, 2007 || Mount Lemmon || Mount Lemmon Survey ||  || align=right | 1.3 km || 
|-id=576 bgcolor=#d6d6d6
| 540576 ||  || — || December 28, 2007 || Kitt Peak || Spacewatch ||  || align=right | 2.0 km || 
|-id=577 bgcolor=#E9E9E9
| 540577 ||  || — || September 17, 2004 || Kitt Peak || Spacewatch ||  || align=right | 1.5 km || 
|-id=578 bgcolor=#d6d6d6
| 540578 ||  || — || September 25, 2006 || Catalina || CSS ||  || align=right | 3.0 km || 
|-id=579 bgcolor=#fefefe
| 540579 ||  || — || October 23, 2012 || Mount Lemmon || Mount Lemmon Survey || H || align=right data-sort-value="0.62" | 620 m || 
|-id=580 bgcolor=#d6d6d6
| 540580 ||  || — || October 9, 2012 || Haleakala || Pan-STARRS ||  || align=right | 2.8 km || 
|-id=581 bgcolor=#fefefe
| 540581 ||  || — || January 20, 2015 || Mount Lemmon || Mount Lemmon Survey ||  || align=right data-sort-value="0.94" | 940 m || 
|-id=582 bgcolor=#d6d6d6
| 540582 ||  || — || November 8, 2007 || Kitt Peak || Spacewatch ||  || align=right | 2.1 km || 
|-id=583 bgcolor=#d6d6d6
| 540583 ||  || — || November 12, 2010 || Mount Lemmon || Mount Lemmon Survey || 3:2 || align=right | 4.0 km || 
|-id=584 bgcolor=#fefefe
| 540584 ||  || — || November 19, 2000 || Socorro || LINEAR ||  || align=right data-sort-value="0.77" | 770 m || 
|-id=585 bgcolor=#E9E9E9
| 540585 ||  || — || November 27, 2013 || Kitt Peak || Spacewatch ||  || align=right | 1.6 km || 
|-id=586 bgcolor=#d6d6d6
| 540586 ||  || — || October 20, 2012 || Haleakala || Pan-STARRS ||  || align=right | 2.6 km || 
|-id=587 bgcolor=#E9E9E9
| 540587 ||  || — || October 3, 2013 || Mount Lemmon || Mount Lemmon Survey ||  || align=right data-sort-value="0.85" | 850 m || 
|-id=588 bgcolor=#d6d6d6
| 540588 ||  || — || November 12, 2001 || Socorro || LINEAR ||  || align=right | 2.8 km || 
|-id=589 bgcolor=#E9E9E9
| 540589 ||  || — || October 8, 2008 || Kitt Peak || Spacewatch ||  || align=right | 1.4 km || 
|-id=590 bgcolor=#fefefe
| 540590 ||  || — || December 3, 2004 || Kitt Peak || Spacewatch ||  || align=right data-sort-value="0.74" | 740 m || 
|-id=591 bgcolor=#d6d6d6
| 540591 ||  || — || October 4, 2006 || Mount Lemmon || Mount Lemmon Survey ||  || align=right | 3.0 km || 
|-id=592 bgcolor=#fefefe
| 540592 ||  || — || September 30, 2006 || Mount Lemmon || Mount Lemmon Survey ||  || align=right data-sort-value="0.86" | 860 m || 
|-id=593 bgcolor=#fefefe
| 540593 ||  || — || April 2, 2016 || Mount Lemmon || Mount Lemmon Survey ||  || align=right data-sort-value="0.79" | 790 m || 
|-id=594 bgcolor=#E9E9E9
| 540594 ||  || — || January 31, 2006 || Kitt Peak || Spacewatch ||  || align=right | 1.4 km || 
|-id=595 bgcolor=#E9E9E9
| 540595 ||  || — || December 15, 2004 || Kitt Peak || Spacewatch ||  || align=right | 1.7 km || 
|-id=596 bgcolor=#E9E9E9
| 540596 ||  || — || October 21, 2008 || Kitt Peak || Spacewatch ||  || align=right | 2.4 km || 
|-id=597 bgcolor=#E9E9E9
| 540597 ||  || — || October 10, 2008 || Mount Lemmon || Mount Lemmon Survey ||  || align=right | 2.1 km || 
|-id=598 bgcolor=#fefefe
| 540598 ||  || — || April 1, 2011 || Mount Lemmon || Mount Lemmon Survey || H || align=right data-sort-value="0.49" | 490 m || 
|-id=599 bgcolor=#FA8072
| 540599 ||  || — || April 6, 2005 || Catalina || CSS ||  || align=right | 2.2 km || 
|-id=600 bgcolor=#E9E9E9
| 540600 ||  || — || October 31, 2008 || Mount Lemmon || Mount Lemmon Survey ||  || align=right | 2.6 km || 
|}

540601–540700 

|-bgcolor=#d6d6d6
| 540601 ||  || — || November 22, 2006 || Catalina || CSS ||  || align=right | 3.2 km || 
|-id=602 bgcolor=#d6d6d6
| 540602 ||  || — || August 20, 2011 || Haleakala || Pan-STARRS ||  || align=right | 2.3 km || 
|-id=603 bgcolor=#d6d6d6
| 540603 ||  || — || January 25, 2009 || Kitt Peak || Spacewatch ||  || align=right | 1.9 km || 
|-id=604 bgcolor=#d6d6d6
| 540604 ||  || — || January 3, 2009 || Mount Lemmon || Mount Lemmon Survey ||  || align=right | 3.4 km || 
|-id=605 bgcolor=#d6d6d6
| 540605 ||  || — || August 28, 2006 || Catalina || CSS ||  || align=right | 2.6 km || 
|-id=606 bgcolor=#d6d6d6
| 540606 ||  || — || September 15, 2007 || Catalina || CSS ||  || align=right | 2.8 km || 
|-id=607 bgcolor=#fefefe
| 540607 ||  || — || March 10, 2016 || Haleakala || Pan-STARRS ||  || align=right data-sort-value="0.75" | 750 m || 
|-id=608 bgcolor=#E9E9E9
| 540608 ||  || — || October 20, 2008 || Kitt Peak || Spacewatch ||  || align=right | 2.0 km || 
|-id=609 bgcolor=#d6d6d6
| 540609 ||  || — || September 20, 1995 || Kitt Peak || Spacewatch ||  || align=right | 2.3 km || 
|-id=610 bgcolor=#d6d6d6
| 540610 ||  || — || August 27, 2006 || Kitt Peak || Spacewatch ||  || align=right | 2.4 km || 
|-id=611 bgcolor=#E9E9E9
| 540611 ||  || — || August 25, 2004 || Kitt Peak || Spacewatch ||  || align=right | 1.5 km || 
|-id=612 bgcolor=#E9E9E9
| 540612 ||  || — || July 30, 2008 || Kitt Peak || Spacewatch ||  || align=right | 1.5 km || 
|-id=613 bgcolor=#fefefe
| 540613 ||  || — || November 15, 2014 || Mount Lemmon || Mount Lemmon Survey ||  || align=right data-sort-value="0.63" | 630 m || 
|-id=614 bgcolor=#E9E9E9
| 540614 ||  || — || February 27, 2015 || Haleakala || Pan-STARRS ||  || align=right | 1.7 km || 
|-id=615 bgcolor=#E9E9E9
| 540615 ||  || — || December 10, 2013 || Mount Lemmon || Mount Lemmon Survey ||  || align=right | 2.0 km || 
|-id=616 bgcolor=#E9E9E9
| 540616 ||  || — || September 25, 2008 || Mount Lemmon || Mount Lemmon Survey ||  || align=right | 1.9 km || 
|-id=617 bgcolor=#E9E9E9
| 540617 ||  || — || April 29, 2003 || Kitt Peak || Spacewatch ||  || align=right | 1.4 km || 
|-id=618 bgcolor=#E9E9E9
| 540618 ||  || — || November 24, 2013 || Haleakala || Pan-STARRS ||  || align=right | 1.2 km || 
|-id=619 bgcolor=#d6d6d6
| 540619 ||  || — || October 11, 2007 || Kitt Peak || Spacewatch ||  || align=right | 2.0 km || 
|-id=620 bgcolor=#fefefe
| 540620 ||  || — || May 14, 2009 || Kitt Peak || Spacewatch ||  || align=right data-sort-value="0.78" | 780 m || 
|-id=621 bgcolor=#E9E9E9
| 540621 ||  || — || May 9, 2011 || Mount Lemmon || Mount Lemmon Survey ||  || align=right | 2.0 km || 
|-id=622 bgcolor=#E9E9E9
| 540622 ||  || — || January 31, 2006 || Kitt Peak || Spacewatch ||  || align=right | 1.3 km || 
|-id=623 bgcolor=#E9E9E9
| 540623 ||  || — || February 16, 2015 || Haleakala || Pan-STARRS ||  || align=right | 2.0 km || 
|-id=624 bgcolor=#E9E9E9
| 540624 ||  || — || October 25, 2008 || Mount Lemmon || Mount Lemmon Survey ||  || align=right | 1.8 km || 
|-id=625 bgcolor=#E9E9E9
| 540625 ||  || — || December 15, 2009 || Mount Lemmon || Mount Lemmon Survey ||  || align=right | 1.0 km || 
|-id=626 bgcolor=#E9E9E9
| 540626 ||  || — || September 23, 2008 || Mount Lemmon || Mount Lemmon Survey ||  || align=right | 1.7 km || 
|-id=627 bgcolor=#d6d6d6
| 540627 ||  || — || March 27, 2003 || Kitt Peak || Spacewatch ||  || align=right | 2.4 km || 
|-id=628 bgcolor=#fefefe
| 540628 ||  || — || October 10, 2010 || Mount Lemmon || Mount Lemmon Survey ||  || align=right data-sort-value="0.68" | 680 m || 
|-id=629 bgcolor=#fefefe
| 540629 ||  || — || November 23, 2014 || Mount Lemmon || Mount Lemmon Survey ||  || align=right data-sort-value="0.54" | 540 m || 
|-id=630 bgcolor=#d6d6d6
| 540630 ||  || — || January 20, 2015 || Haleakala || Pan-STARRS ||  || align=right | 2.9 km || 
|-id=631 bgcolor=#d6d6d6
| 540631 ||  || — || February 18, 2015 || Haleakala || Pan-STARRS ||  || align=right | 2.0 km || 
|-id=632 bgcolor=#E9E9E9
| 540632 ||  || — || October 6, 2008 || Mount Lemmon || Mount Lemmon Survey ||  || align=right | 1.9 km || 
|-id=633 bgcolor=#E9E9E9
| 540633 ||  || — || October 30, 2013 || Haleakala || Pan-STARRS ||  || align=right | 1.3 km || 
|-id=634 bgcolor=#d6d6d6
| 540634 ||  || — || November 14, 2012 || Kitt Peak || Spacewatch ||  || align=right | 1.9 km || 
|-id=635 bgcolor=#E9E9E9
| 540635 ||  || — || November 26, 2013 || Haleakala || Pan-STARRS ||  || align=right | 1.0 km || 
|-id=636 bgcolor=#E9E9E9
| 540636 ||  || — || September 6, 2008 || Kitt Peak || Spacewatch ||  || align=right | 1.2 km || 
|-id=637 bgcolor=#E9E9E9
| 540637 ||  || — || February 27, 2015 || Haleakala || Pan-STARRS ||  || align=right | 1.6 km || 
|-id=638 bgcolor=#E9E9E9
| 540638 ||  || — || October 29, 2008 || Mount Lemmon || Mount Lemmon Survey ||  || align=right | 1.5 km || 
|-id=639 bgcolor=#E9E9E9
| 540639 ||  || — || September 17, 2003 || Kitt Peak || Spacewatch ||  || align=right | 1.8 km || 
|-id=640 bgcolor=#E9E9E9
| 540640 ||  || — || November 10, 2004 || Kitt Peak || Spacewatch ||  || align=right | 2.0 km || 
|-id=641 bgcolor=#E9E9E9
| 540641 ||  || — || November 2, 2013 || Kitt Peak || Spacewatch ||  || align=right | 1.1 km || 
|-id=642 bgcolor=#E9E9E9
| 540642 ||  || — || April 12, 2016 || Haleakala || Pan-STARRS ||  || align=right | 2.0 km || 
|-id=643 bgcolor=#E9E9E9
| 540643 ||  || — || February 2, 2006 || Kitt Peak || Spacewatch ||  || align=right | 2.3 km || 
|-id=644 bgcolor=#d6d6d6
| 540644 ||  || — || November 13, 2012 || Mount Lemmon || Mount Lemmon Survey ||  || align=right | 1.9 km || 
|-id=645 bgcolor=#E9E9E9
| 540645 ||  || — || October 27, 2008 || Kitt Peak || Spacewatch ||  || align=right | 1.7 km || 
|-id=646 bgcolor=#E9E9E9
| 540646 ||  || — || February 18, 2015 || Haleakala || Pan-STARRS ||  || align=right | 1.3 km || 
|-id=647 bgcolor=#E9E9E9
| 540647 ||  || — || September 13, 2013 || Mount Lemmon || Mount Lemmon Survey ||  || align=right data-sort-value="0.89" | 890 m || 
|-id=648 bgcolor=#E9E9E9
| 540648 ||  || — || October 4, 2004 || Kitt Peak || Spacewatch ||  || align=right | 1.6 km || 
|-id=649 bgcolor=#E9E9E9
| 540649 ||  || — || September 22, 2003 || Anderson Mesa || LONEOS ||  || align=right | 2.0 km || 
|-id=650 bgcolor=#E9E9E9
| 540650 ||  || — || October 21, 2003 || Kitt Peak || Spacewatch ||  || align=right | 2.2 km || 
|-id=651 bgcolor=#fefefe
| 540651 ||  || — || January 18, 2009 || Kitt Peak || Spacewatch ||  || align=right data-sort-value="0.54" | 540 m || 
|-id=652 bgcolor=#d6d6d6
| 540652 ||  || — || December 17, 2007 || Mount Lemmon || Mount Lemmon Survey ||  || align=right | 1.9 km || 
|-id=653 bgcolor=#E9E9E9
| 540653 ||  || — || September 25, 2008 || Kitt Peak || Spacewatch ||  || align=right | 1.7 km || 
|-id=654 bgcolor=#d6d6d6
| 540654 ||  || — || August 26, 2012 || Haleakala || Pan-STARRS ||  || align=right | 1.8 km || 
|-id=655 bgcolor=#E9E9E9
| 540655 ||  || — || September 24, 2008 || Kitt Peak || Spacewatch ||  || align=right | 1.9 km || 
|-id=656 bgcolor=#d6d6d6
| 540656 ||  || — || September 28, 1994 || Kitt Peak || Spacewatch ||  || align=right | 5.3 km || 
|-id=657 bgcolor=#d6d6d6
| 540657 ||  || — || October 10, 2012 || Haleakala || Pan-STARRS ||  || align=right | 3.1 km || 
|-id=658 bgcolor=#d6d6d6
| 540658 ||  || — || October 13, 2007 || Kitt Peak || Spacewatch ||  || align=right | 2.0 km || 
|-id=659 bgcolor=#E9E9E9
| 540659 ||  || — || January 26, 2006 || Kitt Peak || Spacewatch ||  || align=right | 1.9 km || 
|-id=660 bgcolor=#E9E9E9
| 540660 ||  || — || October 10, 2005 || Kitt Peak || Spacewatch ||  || align=right data-sort-value="0.83" | 830 m || 
|-id=661 bgcolor=#d6d6d6
| 540661 ||  || — || October 16, 2006 || Catalina || CSS ||  || align=right | 3.0 km || 
|-id=662 bgcolor=#E9E9E9
| 540662 ||  || — || April 5, 2003 || Kitt Peak || Spacewatch ||  || align=right | 5.0 km || 
|-id=663 bgcolor=#E9E9E9
| 540663 ||  || — || October 25, 2005 || Mount Lemmon || Mount Lemmon Survey ||  || align=right | 1.0 km || 
|-id=664 bgcolor=#fefefe
| 540664 ||  || — || October 18, 1998 || Kitt Peak || Spacewatch ||  || align=right data-sort-value="0.65" | 650 m || 
|-id=665 bgcolor=#fefefe
| 540665 ||  || — || February 5, 2011 || Mount Lemmon || Mount Lemmon Survey ||  || align=right data-sort-value="0.65" | 650 m || 
|-id=666 bgcolor=#d6d6d6
| 540666 ||  || — || March 18, 2009 || Kitt Peak || Spacewatch ||  || align=right | 3.0 km || 
|-id=667 bgcolor=#d6d6d6
| 540667 ||  || — || December 29, 2008 || Mount Lemmon || Mount Lemmon Survey ||  || align=right | 2.7 km || 
|-id=668 bgcolor=#E9E9E9
| 540668 ||  || — || November 27, 2013 || Haleakala || Pan-STARRS ||  || align=right | 2.1 km || 
|-id=669 bgcolor=#E9E9E9
| 540669 ||  || — || September 1, 2008 || Siding Spring || SSS ||  || align=right | 1.8 km || 
|-id=670 bgcolor=#fefefe
| 540670 ||  || — || April 27, 2008 || Mount Lemmon || Mount Lemmon Survey || H || align=right data-sort-value="0.74" | 740 m || 
|-id=671 bgcolor=#d6d6d6
| 540671 ||  || — || September 11, 2007 || Kitt Peak || Spacewatch ||  || align=right | 2.2 km || 
|-id=672 bgcolor=#d6d6d6
| 540672 ||  || — || September 25, 2006 || Mount Lemmon || Mount Lemmon Survey ||  || align=right | 2.1 km || 
|-id=673 bgcolor=#d6d6d6
| 540673 ||  || — || October 23, 2006 || Mount Lemmon || Mount Lemmon Survey ||  || align=right | 3.0 km || 
|-id=674 bgcolor=#E9E9E9
| 540674 ||  || — || April 21, 2006 || Kitt Peak || Spacewatch ||  || align=right | 1.8 km || 
|-id=675 bgcolor=#E9E9E9
| 540675 ||  || — || November 28, 2013 || Mount Lemmon || Mount Lemmon Survey ||  || align=right | 1.0 km || 
|-id=676 bgcolor=#E9E9E9
| 540676 ||  || — || April 22, 2012 || Kitt Peak || Spacewatch ||  || align=right data-sort-value="0.83" | 830 m || 
|-id=677 bgcolor=#E9E9E9
| 540677 ||  || — || September 9, 2008 || Catalina || CSS ||  || align=right | 1.5 km || 
|-id=678 bgcolor=#d6d6d6
| 540678 ||  || — || March 11, 2014 || Mount Lemmon || Mount Lemmon Survey ||  || align=right | 2.1 km || 
|-id=679 bgcolor=#d6d6d6
| 540679 ||  || — || March 25, 2014 || Mount Lemmon || Mount Lemmon Survey ||  || align=right | 2.6 km || 
|-id=680 bgcolor=#fefefe
| 540680 ||  || — || January 13, 2015 || Haleakala || Pan-STARRS ||  || align=right data-sort-value="0.67" | 670 m || 
|-id=681 bgcolor=#E9E9E9
| 540681 ||  || — || October 10, 2008 || Mount Lemmon || Mount Lemmon Survey ||  || align=right | 1.5 km || 
|-id=682 bgcolor=#fefefe
| 540682 ||  || — || January 16, 2015 || Haleakala || Pan-STARRS ||  || align=right data-sort-value="0.75" | 750 m || 
|-id=683 bgcolor=#d6d6d6
| 540683 ||  || — || March 29, 2009 || Catalina || CSS ||  || align=right | 2.9 km || 
|-id=684 bgcolor=#d6d6d6
| 540684 ||  || — || March 25, 2015 || Haleakala || Pan-STARRS ||  || align=right | 2.8 km || 
|-id=685 bgcolor=#d6d6d6
| 540685 ||  || — || November 28, 2013 || Mount Lemmon || Mount Lemmon Survey ||  || align=right | 3.4 km || 
|-id=686 bgcolor=#d6d6d6
| 540686 ||  || — || January 17, 2013 || Haleakala || Pan-STARRS ||  || align=right | 2.1 km || 
|-id=687 bgcolor=#d6d6d6
| 540687 ||  || — || September 30, 2006 || Mount Lemmon || Mount Lemmon Survey ||  || align=right | 2.7 km || 
|-id=688 bgcolor=#E9E9E9
| 540688 ||  || — || March 3, 2010 || WISE || WISE ||  || align=right | 1.1 km || 
|-id=689 bgcolor=#E9E9E9
| 540689 ||  || — || April 18, 2010 || WISE || WISE ||  || align=right | 2.0 km || 
|-id=690 bgcolor=#d6d6d6
| 540690 ||  || — || April 8, 2008 || Mount Lemmon || Mount Lemmon Survey || Tj (2.99) || align=right | 3.1 km || 
|-id=691 bgcolor=#E9E9E9
| 540691 ||  || — || November 27, 2009 || Mount Lemmon || Mount Lemmon Survey ||  || align=right | 1.1 km || 
|-id=692 bgcolor=#fefefe
| 540692 ||  || — || May 3, 2005 || Kitt Peak || Spacewatch || H || align=right data-sort-value="0.67" | 670 m || 
|-id=693 bgcolor=#E9E9E9
| 540693 ||  || — || November 1, 2000 || Socorro || LINEAR ||  || align=right | 1.4 km || 
|-id=694 bgcolor=#E9E9E9
| 540694 ||  || — || March 21, 2015 || Haleakala || Pan-STARRS ||  || align=right | 1.2 km || 
|-id=695 bgcolor=#E9E9E9
| 540695 ||  || — || November 17, 2009 || Catalina || CSS ||  || align=right | 2.5 km || 
|-id=696 bgcolor=#d6d6d6
| 540696 ||  || — || September 19, 2006 || Kitt Peak || Spacewatch ||  || align=right | 2.0 km || 
|-id=697 bgcolor=#d6d6d6
| 540697 ||  || — || March 8, 2014 || Mount Lemmon || Mount Lemmon Survey ||  || align=right | 2.7 km || 
|-id=698 bgcolor=#E9E9E9
| 540698 ||  || — || September 19, 2003 || Kitt Peak || Spacewatch ||  || align=right | 1.8 km || 
|-id=699 bgcolor=#d6d6d6
| 540699 ||  || — || March 28, 2009 || Kitt Peak || Spacewatch ||  || align=right | 2.4 km || 
|-id=700 bgcolor=#E9E9E9
| 540700 ||  || — || October 9, 2008 || Kitt Peak || Spacewatch ||  || align=right | 1.2 km || 
|}

540701–540800 

|-bgcolor=#d6d6d6
| 540701 ||  || — || October 24, 2011 || Mount Lemmon || Mount Lemmon Survey ||  || align=right | 2.9 km || 
|-id=702 bgcolor=#d6d6d6
| 540702 ||  || — || September 19, 2011 || Haleakala || Pan-STARRS ||  || align=right | 2.9 km || 
|-id=703 bgcolor=#E9E9E9
| 540703 ||  || — || April 1, 2011 || Kitt Peak || Spacewatch ||  || align=right data-sort-value="0.73" | 730 m || 
|-id=704 bgcolor=#E9E9E9
| 540704 ||  || — || October 10, 2008 || Mount Lemmon || Mount Lemmon Survey ||  || align=right | 1.6 km || 
|-id=705 bgcolor=#d6d6d6
| 540705 ||  || — || March 1, 2008 || Kitt Peak || Spacewatch ||  || align=right | 2.4 km || 
|-id=706 bgcolor=#E9E9E9
| 540706 ||  || — || November 13, 2013 || Mount Lemmon || Mount Lemmon Survey ||  || align=right | 1.1 km || 
|-id=707 bgcolor=#d6d6d6
| 540707 ||  || — || December 10, 2012 || Haleakala || Pan-STARRS ||  || align=right | 2.4 km || 
|-id=708 bgcolor=#E9E9E9
| 540708 ||  || — || March 26, 2011 || Kitt Peak || Spacewatch ||  || align=right | 1.5 km || 
|-id=709 bgcolor=#E9E9E9
| 540709 ||  || — || January 29, 2015 || Haleakala || Pan-STARRS ||  || align=right | 1.4 km || 
|-id=710 bgcolor=#E9E9E9
| 540710 ||  || — || January 5, 2002 || Kitt Peak || Spacewatch ||  || align=right | 2.3 km || 
|-id=711 bgcolor=#E9E9E9
| 540711 ||  || — || November 20, 2004 || Kitt Peak || Spacewatch ||  || align=right | 2.3 km || 
|-id=712 bgcolor=#E9E9E9
| 540712 ||  || — || October 8, 2008 || Mount Lemmon || Mount Lemmon Survey ||  || align=right | 1.2 km || 
|-id=713 bgcolor=#d6d6d6
| 540713 ||  || — || September 4, 2011 || Haleakala || Pan-STARRS ||  || align=right | 2.5 km || 
|-id=714 bgcolor=#d6d6d6
| 540714 ||  || — || October 22, 2012 || Mount Lemmon || Mount Lemmon Survey ||  || align=right | 2.8 km || 
|-id=715 bgcolor=#fefefe
| 540715 ||  || — || December 11, 2010 || Mount Lemmon || Mount Lemmon Survey ||  || align=right data-sort-value="0.83" | 830 m || 
|-id=716 bgcolor=#fefefe
| 540716 ||  || — || November 9, 2006 || Kitt Peak || Spacewatch ||  || align=right data-sort-value="0.76" | 760 m || 
|-id=717 bgcolor=#E9E9E9
| 540717 ||  || — || April 30, 2011 || Mount Lemmon || Mount Lemmon Survey ||  || align=right | 1.5 km || 
|-id=718 bgcolor=#E9E9E9
| 540718 ||  || — || January 26, 2001 || Kitt Peak || Spacewatch ||  || align=right | 1.2 km || 
|-id=719 bgcolor=#E9E9E9
| 540719 ||  || — || September 21, 2003 || Kitt Peak || Spacewatch ||  || align=right | 1.8 km || 
|-id=720 bgcolor=#d6d6d6
| 540720 ||  || — || October 28, 2006 || Kitt Peak || Spacewatch ||  || align=right | 2.5 km || 
|-id=721 bgcolor=#E9E9E9
| 540721 ||  || — || October 9, 2012 || Mount Lemmon || Mount Lemmon Survey ||  || align=right | 1.6 km || 
|-id=722 bgcolor=#E9E9E9
| 540722 ||  || — || October 19, 2008 || Kitt Peak || Spacewatch ||  || align=right | 1.2 km || 
|-id=723 bgcolor=#d6d6d6
| 540723 ||  || — || November 17, 2006 || Kitt Peak || Spacewatch ||  || align=right | 3.1 km || 
|-id=724 bgcolor=#d6d6d6
| 540724 ||  || — || July 8, 2016 || Haleakala || Pan-STARRS ||  || align=right | 2.9 km || 
|-id=725 bgcolor=#E9E9E9
| 540725 ||  || — || November 21, 2008 || Kitt Peak || Spacewatch ||  || align=right | 2.0 km || 
|-id=726 bgcolor=#fefefe
| 540726 ||  || — || November 20, 2006 || Kitt Peak || Spacewatch ||  || align=right data-sort-value="0.72" | 720 m || 
|-id=727 bgcolor=#E9E9E9
| 540727 ||  || — || October 1, 2005 || Mount Lemmon || Mount Lemmon Survey ||  || align=right data-sort-value="0.89" | 890 m || 
|-id=728 bgcolor=#E9E9E9
| 540728 ||  || — || March 21, 2015 || Haleakala || Pan-STARRS ||  || align=right | 1.3 km || 
|-id=729 bgcolor=#E9E9E9
| 540729 ||  || — || October 10, 2004 || Kitt Peak || Spacewatch ||  || align=right | 1.2 km || 
|-id=730 bgcolor=#E9E9E9
| 540730 ||  || — || November 9, 2004 || Catalina || CSS ||  || align=right | 1.2 km || 
|-id=731 bgcolor=#E9E9E9
| 540731 ||  || — || March 11, 2002 || Kitt Peak || Spacewatch ||  || align=right | 1.5 km || 
|-id=732 bgcolor=#E9E9E9
| 540732 ||  || — || February 16, 2015 || Haleakala || Pan-STARRS ||  || align=right | 1.3 km || 
|-id=733 bgcolor=#fefefe
| 540733 ||  || — || June 18, 2013 || Haleakala || Pan-STARRS ||  || align=right data-sort-value="0.91" | 910 m || 
|-id=734 bgcolor=#E9E9E9
| 540734 ||  || — || April 11, 2011 || Mount Lemmon || Mount Lemmon Survey ||  || align=right | 1.6 km || 
|-id=735 bgcolor=#fefefe
| 540735 ||  || — || November 8, 2007 || Mount Lemmon || Mount Lemmon Survey ||  || align=right data-sort-value="0.67" | 670 m || 
|-id=736 bgcolor=#d6d6d6
| 540736 ||  || — || November 26, 2006 || Kitt Peak || Spacewatch ||  || align=right | 2.6 km || 
|-id=737 bgcolor=#E9E9E9
| 540737 ||  || — || October 22, 2003 || Kitt Peak || Spacewatch ||  || align=right | 2.0 km || 
|-id=738 bgcolor=#fefefe
| 540738 ||  || — || September 28, 2003 || Kitt Peak || Spacewatch ||  || align=right data-sort-value="0.54" | 540 m || 
|-id=739 bgcolor=#d6d6d6
| 540739 ||  || — || October 2, 2006 || Mount Lemmon || Mount Lemmon Survey ||  || align=right | 3.1 km || 
|-id=740 bgcolor=#d6d6d6
| 540740 ||  || — || March 12, 2014 || Mount Lemmon || Mount Lemmon Survey ||  || align=right | 2.7 km || 
|-id=741 bgcolor=#d6d6d6
| 540741 ||  || — || August 24, 2011 || Haleakala || Pan-STARRS ||  || align=right | 2.6 km || 
|-id=742 bgcolor=#E9E9E9
| 540742 ||  || — || October 8, 2012 || Mount Lemmon || Mount Lemmon Survey ||  || align=right | 2.0 km || 
|-id=743 bgcolor=#d6d6d6
| 540743 ||  || — || December 15, 2001 || Socorro || LINEAR ||  || align=right | 4.3 km || 
|-id=744 bgcolor=#fefefe
| 540744 ||  || — || January 17, 2007 || Catalina || CSS ||  || align=right data-sort-value="0.92" | 920 m || 
|-id=745 bgcolor=#E9E9E9
| 540745 ||  || — || February 19, 2010 || Catalina || CSS ||  || align=right | 1.1 km || 
|-id=746 bgcolor=#E9E9E9
| 540746 ||  || — || October 23, 2003 || Kitt Peak || Spacewatch ||  || align=right | 2.3 km || 
|-id=747 bgcolor=#fefefe
| 540747 ||  || — || March 17, 2009 || Kitt Peak || Spacewatch ||  || align=right data-sort-value="0.65" | 650 m || 
|-id=748 bgcolor=#d6d6d6
| 540748 ||  || — || November 13, 2006 || Kitt Peak || Spacewatch ||  || align=right | 2.3 km || 
|-id=749 bgcolor=#E9E9E9
| 540749 ||  || — || November 9, 2009 || Kitt Peak || Spacewatch ||  || align=right data-sort-value="0.97" | 970 m || 
|-id=750 bgcolor=#fefefe
| 540750 ||  || — || November 2, 2000 || Socorro || LINEAR ||  || align=right data-sort-value="0.77" | 770 m || 
|-id=751 bgcolor=#E9E9E9
| 540751 ||  || — || March 14, 2007 || Catalina || CSS ||  || align=right | 4.4 km || 
|-id=752 bgcolor=#fefefe
| 540752 ||  || — || October 9, 2004 || Kitt Peak || Spacewatch || H || align=right data-sort-value="0.63" | 630 m || 
|-id=753 bgcolor=#E9E9E9
| 540753 ||  || — || October 9, 2008 || Mount Lemmon || Mount Lemmon Survey ||  || align=right | 1.5 km || 
|-id=754 bgcolor=#fefefe
| 540754 ||  || — || October 30, 2010 || Mount Lemmon || Mount Lemmon Survey ||  || align=right data-sort-value="0.71" | 710 m || 
|-id=755 bgcolor=#E9E9E9
| 540755 ||  || — || December 25, 2013 || Kitt Peak || Spacewatch ||  || align=right | 2.1 km || 
|-id=756 bgcolor=#E9E9E9
| 540756 ||  || — || January 12, 2010 || Catalina || CSS ||  || align=right data-sort-value="0.99" | 990 m || 
|-id=757 bgcolor=#d6d6d6
| 540757 ||  || — || August 19, 2006 || Kitt Peak || Spacewatch ||  || align=right | 2.5 km || 
|-id=758 bgcolor=#E9E9E9
| 540758 ||  || — || January 25, 2015 || Haleakala || Pan-STARRS ||  || align=right | 1.6 km || 
|-id=759 bgcolor=#E9E9E9
| 540759 ||  || — || January 15, 2005 || Kitt Peak || Spacewatch ||  || align=right | 2.6 km || 
|-id=760 bgcolor=#d6d6d6
| 540760 ||  || — || February 10, 2014 || Haleakala || Pan-STARRS ||  || align=right | 3.1 km || 
|-id=761 bgcolor=#E9E9E9
| 540761 ||  || — || August 17, 2012 || Haleakala || Pan-STARRS ||  || align=right | 1.4 km || 
|-id=762 bgcolor=#E9E9E9
| 540762 ||  || — || November 7, 2004 || Socorro || LINEAR ||  || align=right | 1.7 km || 
|-id=763 bgcolor=#E9E9E9
| 540763 ||  || — || July 18, 2013 || Haleakala || Pan-STARRS ||  || align=right | 1.4 km || 
|-id=764 bgcolor=#E9E9E9
| 540764 ||  || — || December 27, 2006 || Mount Lemmon || Mount Lemmon Survey ||  || align=right | 1.2 km || 
|-id=765 bgcolor=#E9E9E9
| 540765 ||  || — || September 21, 2003 || Anderson Mesa || LONEOS ||  || align=right | 2.4 km || 
|-id=766 bgcolor=#d6d6d6
| 540766 ||  || — || October 22, 2006 || Siding Spring || SSS || Tj (2.98) || align=right | 3.7 km || 
|-id=767 bgcolor=#d6d6d6
| 540767 ||  || — || September 18, 2006 || Catalina || CSS ||  || align=right | 3.4 km || 
|-id=768 bgcolor=#d6d6d6
| 540768 ||  || — || March 3, 1997 || Kitt Peak || Spacewatch ||  || align=right | 3.5 km || 
|-id=769 bgcolor=#d6d6d6
| 540769 ||  || — || December 18, 2001 || Socorro || LINEAR || Tj (2.98) || align=right | 3.5 km || 
|-id=770 bgcolor=#E9E9E9
| 540770 ||  || — || October 24, 2008 || Siding Spring || SSS ||  || align=right | 4.2 km || 
|-id=771 bgcolor=#E9E9E9
| 540771 ||  || — || October 6, 2005 || Mount Lemmon || Mount Lemmon Survey ||  || align=right | 1.1 km || 
|-id=772 bgcolor=#fefefe
| 540772 ||  || — || January 13, 2011 || Kitt Peak || Spacewatch ||  || align=right data-sort-value="0.83" | 830 m || 
|-id=773 bgcolor=#E9E9E9
| 540773 ||  || — || October 1, 2003 || Kitt Peak || Spacewatch ||  || align=right | 2.0 km || 
|-id=774 bgcolor=#E9E9E9
| 540774 ||  || — || June 16, 2012 || Haleakala || Pan-STARRS ||  || align=right data-sort-value="0.84" | 840 m || 
|-id=775 bgcolor=#E9E9E9
| 540775 ||  || — || April 3, 2011 || Haleakala || Pan-STARRS ||  || align=right | 1.9 km || 
|-id=776 bgcolor=#d6d6d6
| 540776 ||  || — || February 1, 2008 || Catalina || CSS ||  || align=right | 4.6 km || 
|-id=777 bgcolor=#fefefe
| 540777 ||  || — || September 17, 2009 || Mount Lemmon || Mount Lemmon Survey ||  || align=right data-sort-value="0.85" | 850 m || 
|-id=778 bgcolor=#E9E9E9
| 540778 ||  || — || June 4, 2011 || Mount Lemmon || Mount Lemmon Survey ||  || align=right | 2.5 km || 
|-id=779 bgcolor=#E9E9E9
| 540779 ||  || — || January 21, 2014 || Kitt Peak || Spacewatch ||  || align=right | 1.9 km || 
|-id=780 bgcolor=#E9E9E9
| 540780 ||  || — || June 8, 2016 || Haleakala || Pan-STARRS ||  || align=right | 1.3 km || 
|-id=781 bgcolor=#fefefe
| 540781 ||  || — || December 21, 2014 || Mount Lemmon || Mount Lemmon Survey ||  || align=right data-sort-value="0.62" | 620 m || 
|-id=782 bgcolor=#d6d6d6
| 540782 ||  || — || March 5, 2008 || Mount Lemmon || Mount Lemmon Survey ||  || align=right | 2.9 km || 
|-id=783 bgcolor=#d6d6d6
| 540783 ||  || — || February 24, 2010 || WISE || WISE ||  || align=right | 3.2 km || 
|-id=784 bgcolor=#E9E9E9
| 540784 ||  || — || June 18, 2015 || Haleakala || Pan-STARRS ||  || align=right | 1.4 km || 
|-id=785 bgcolor=#d6d6d6
| 540785 ||  || — || August 7, 2016 || Haleakala || Pan-STARRS ||  || align=right | 2.7 km || 
|-id=786 bgcolor=#d6d6d6
| 540786 ||  || — || September 24, 2011 || Haleakala || Pan-STARRS ||  || align=right | 3.3 km || 
|-id=787 bgcolor=#E9E9E9
| 540787 ||  || — || September 20, 2009 || Mount Lemmon || Mount Lemmon Survey ||  || align=right | 1.1 km || 
|-id=788 bgcolor=#d6d6d6
| 540788 ||  || — || March 19, 2009 || Kitt Peak || Spacewatch ||  || align=right | 2.8 km || 
|-id=789 bgcolor=#E9E9E9
| 540789 ||  || — || January 12, 2010 || Mount Lemmon || Mount Lemmon Survey ||  || align=right | 1.1 km || 
|-id=790 bgcolor=#fefefe
| 540790 ||  || — || January 30, 2011 || Mount Lemmon || Mount Lemmon Survey ||  || align=right data-sort-value="0.68" | 680 m || 
|-id=791 bgcolor=#d6d6d6
| 540791 ||  || — || June 11, 2015 || Haleakala || Pan-STARRS ||  || align=right | 2.8 km || 
|-id=792 bgcolor=#E9E9E9
| 540792 ||  || — || September 29, 2003 || Kitt Peak || Spacewatch ||  || align=right | 2.1 km || 
|-id=793 bgcolor=#fefefe
| 540793 ||  || — || August 20, 2009 || La Sagra || OAM Obs. ||  || align=right data-sort-value="0.75" | 750 m || 
|-id=794 bgcolor=#E9E9E9
| 540794 ||  || — || October 9, 2012 || Mount Lemmon || Mount Lemmon Survey ||  || align=right | 1.6 km || 
|-id=795 bgcolor=#E9E9E9
| 540795 ||  || — || September 24, 2012 || Kitt Peak || Spacewatch ||  || align=right | 1.9 km || 
|-id=796 bgcolor=#d6d6d6
| 540796 ||  || — || November 23, 2006 || Kitt Peak || Spacewatch ||  || align=right | 2.4 km || 
|-id=797 bgcolor=#E9E9E9
| 540797 ||  || — || September 22, 2008 || Kitt Peak || Spacewatch ||  || align=right | 1.4 km || 
|-id=798 bgcolor=#fefefe
| 540798 ||  || — || January 28, 2007 || Kitt Peak || Spacewatch ||  || align=right | 1.1 km || 
|-id=799 bgcolor=#E9E9E9
| 540799 ||  || — || October 31, 2013 || Mount Lemmon || Mount Lemmon Survey ||  || align=right | 1.3 km || 
|-id=800 bgcolor=#E9E9E9
| 540800 ||  || — || November 26, 2013 || Mount Lemmon || Mount Lemmon Survey ||  || align=right data-sort-value="0.73" | 730 m || 
|}

540801–540900 

|-bgcolor=#E9E9E9
| 540801 ||  || — || September 17, 2004 || Kitt Peak || Spacewatch ||  || align=right | 1.2 km || 
|-id=802 bgcolor=#d6d6d6
| 540802 ||  || — || December 22, 2012 || Haleakala || Pan-STARRS ||  || align=right | 2.3 km || 
|-id=803 bgcolor=#E9E9E9
| 540803 ||  || — || November 12, 2005 || Kitt Peak || Spacewatch ||  || align=right | 1.0 km || 
|-id=804 bgcolor=#d6d6d6
| 540804 ||  || — || October 27, 2006 || Mount Lemmon || Mount Lemmon Survey ||  || align=right | 1.8 km || 
|-id=805 bgcolor=#d6d6d6
| 540805 ||  || — || October 22, 2006 || Kitt Peak || Spacewatch ||  || align=right | 2.4 km || 
|-id=806 bgcolor=#E9E9E9
| 540806 ||  || — || November 29, 2005 || Kitt Peak || Spacewatch ||  || align=right data-sort-value="0.88" | 880 m || 
|-id=807 bgcolor=#E9E9E9
| 540807 ||  || — || November 26, 2005 || Kitt Peak || Spacewatch ||  || align=right | 1.0 km || 
|-id=808 bgcolor=#E9E9E9
| 540808 ||  || — || August 3, 2004 || Siding Spring || SSS ||  || align=right | 1.1 km || 
|-id=809 bgcolor=#E9E9E9
| 540809 ||  || — || April 22, 2007 || Kitt Peak || Spacewatch ||  || align=right | 1.4 km || 
|-id=810 bgcolor=#d6d6d6
| 540810 ||  || — || September 10, 2007 || Kitt Peak || Spacewatch ||  || align=right | 1.8 km || 
|-id=811 bgcolor=#d6d6d6
| 540811 ||  || — || September 30, 2006 || Mount Lemmon || Mount Lemmon Survey ||  || align=right | 2.6 km || 
|-id=812 bgcolor=#E9E9E9
| 540812 ||  || — || October 10, 2012 || Mount Lemmon || Mount Lemmon Survey ||  || align=right | 2.5 km || 
|-id=813 bgcolor=#d6d6d6
| 540813 ||  || — || October 27, 2006 || Mount Lemmon || Mount Lemmon Survey ||  || align=right | 3.1 km || 
|-id=814 bgcolor=#fefefe
| 540814 ||  || — || September 6, 2013 || Kitt Peak || Spacewatch ||  || align=right data-sort-value="0.91" | 910 m || 
|-id=815 bgcolor=#E9E9E9
| 540815 ||  || — || January 25, 2006 || Kitt Peak || Spacewatch ||  || align=right | 1.3 km || 
|-id=816 bgcolor=#E9E9E9
| 540816 ||  || — || November 18, 2008 || Kitt Peak || Spacewatch ||  || align=right | 1.9 km || 
|-id=817 bgcolor=#fefefe
| 540817 ||  || — || January 20, 2015 || Haleakala || Pan-STARRS ||  || align=right data-sort-value="0.61" | 610 m || 
|-id=818 bgcolor=#E9E9E9
| 540818 ||  || — || August 10, 2007 || Kitt Peak || Spacewatch ||  || align=right | 1.9 km || 
|-id=819 bgcolor=#E9E9E9
| 540819 ||  || — || January 28, 2015 || Haleakala || Pan-STARRS ||  || align=right | 1.6 km || 
|-id=820 bgcolor=#d6d6d6
| 540820 ||  || — || November 12, 2012 || Kitt Peak || Spacewatch ||  || align=right | 2.3 km || 
|-id=821 bgcolor=#E9E9E9
| 540821 ||  || — || September 28, 2003 || Kitt Peak || Spacewatch ||  || align=right | 1.9 km || 
|-id=822 bgcolor=#d6d6d6
| 540822 ||  || — || September 28, 2011 || Kitt Peak || Spacewatch ||  || align=right | 2.9 km || 
|-id=823 bgcolor=#fefefe
| 540823 ||  || — || April 22, 2004 || Kitt Peak || Spacewatch ||  || align=right data-sort-value="0.73" | 730 m || 
|-id=824 bgcolor=#E9E9E9
| 540824 ||  || — || May 4, 2006 || Mount Lemmon || Mount Lemmon Survey ||  || align=right | 2.0 km || 
|-id=825 bgcolor=#E9E9E9
| 540825 ||  || — || May 8, 2011 || Mount Lemmon || Mount Lemmon Survey ||  || align=right | 1.9 km || 
|-id=826 bgcolor=#E9E9E9
| 540826 ||  || — || October 31, 2008 || Kitt Peak || Spacewatch ||  || align=right | 2.1 km || 
|-id=827 bgcolor=#d6d6d6
| 540827 ||  || — || January 29, 2009 || Kitt Peak || Spacewatch ||  || align=right | 2.2 km || 
|-id=828 bgcolor=#d6d6d6
| 540828 ||  || — || February 24, 2014 || Haleakala || Pan-STARRS ||  || align=right | 2.5 km || 
|-id=829 bgcolor=#E9E9E9
| 540829 ||  || — || September 25, 2008 || Kitt Peak || Spacewatch ||  || align=right | 1.2 km || 
|-id=830 bgcolor=#E9E9E9
| 540830 ||  || — || September 3, 2008 || Kitt Peak || Spacewatch ||  || align=right | 1.1 km || 
|-id=831 bgcolor=#fefefe
| 540831 ||  || — || September 27, 2006 || Kitt Peak || Spacewatch ||  || align=right data-sort-value="0.66" | 660 m || 
|-id=832 bgcolor=#E9E9E9
| 540832 ||  || — || November 30, 2003 || Kitt Peak || Spacewatch ||  || align=right | 2.6 km || 
|-id=833 bgcolor=#E9E9E9
| 540833 ||  || — || December 25, 2013 || Kitt Peak || Spacewatch ||  || align=right | 1.6 km || 
|-id=834 bgcolor=#E9E9E9
| 540834 ||  || — || April 23, 2015 || Haleakala || Pan-STARRS ||  || align=right | 1.1 km || 
|-id=835 bgcolor=#d6d6d6
| 540835 ||  || — || July 25, 2011 || Haleakala || Pan-STARRS ||  || align=right | 1.8 km || 
|-id=836 bgcolor=#E9E9E9
| 540836 ||  || — || December 11, 2004 || Kitt Peak || Spacewatch ||  || align=right | 1.5 km || 
|-id=837 bgcolor=#E9E9E9
| 540837 ||  || — || January 26, 2006 || Kitt Peak || Spacewatch ||  || align=right | 1.0 km || 
|-id=838 bgcolor=#d6d6d6
| 540838 ||  || — || January 17, 2009 || Kitt Peak || Spacewatch ||  || align=right | 2.1 km || 
|-id=839 bgcolor=#E9E9E9
| 540839 ||  || — || October 10, 2012 || Mount Lemmon || Mount Lemmon Survey ||  || align=right | 2.3 km || 
|-id=840 bgcolor=#fefefe
| 540840 ||  || — || February 23, 2007 || Kitt Peak || Spacewatch ||  || align=right data-sort-value="0.71" | 710 m || 
|-id=841 bgcolor=#E9E9E9
| 540841 ||  || — || December 1, 2000 || Kitt Peak || Spacewatch ||  || align=right | 1.7 km || 
|-id=842 bgcolor=#E9E9E9
| 540842 ||  || — || October 10, 2008 || Mount Lemmon || Mount Lemmon Survey ||  || align=right | 1.6 km || 
|-id=843 bgcolor=#d6d6d6
| 540843 ||  || — || August 29, 2016 || Mount Lemmon || Mount Lemmon Survey ||  || align=right | 2.8 km || 
|-id=844 bgcolor=#d6d6d6
| 540844 ||  || — || December 23, 2012 || Haleakala || Pan-STARRS ||  || align=right | 2.1 km || 
|-id=845 bgcolor=#fefefe
| 540845 ||  || — || October 13, 2010 || Mount Lemmon || Mount Lemmon Survey ||  || align=right data-sort-value="0.79" | 790 m || 
|-id=846 bgcolor=#d6d6d6
| 540846 ||  || — || June 7, 2016 || Haleakala || Pan-STARRS ||  || align=right | 2.4 km || 
|-id=847 bgcolor=#d6d6d6
| 540847 ||  || — || November 1, 2007 || Kitt Peak || Spacewatch ||  || align=right | 2.2 km || 
|-id=848 bgcolor=#d6d6d6
| 540848 ||  || — || December 18, 2007 || Mount Lemmon || Mount Lemmon Survey ||  || align=right | 2.2 km || 
|-id=849 bgcolor=#fefefe
| 540849 ||  || — || January 19, 2015 || Mount Lemmon || Mount Lemmon Survey ||  || align=right data-sort-value="0.87" | 870 m || 
|-id=850 bgcolor=#d6d6d6
| 540850 ||  || — || October 8, 2012 || Mount Lemmon || Mount Lemmon Survey ||  || align=right | 1.9 km || 
|-id=851 bgcolor=#E9E9E9
| 540851 ||  || — || August 22, 2003 || Campo Imperatore || CINEOS ||  || align=right | 1.5 km || 
|-id=852 bgcolor=#d6d6d6
| 540852 ||  || — || September 29, 2000 || Kitt Peak || Spacewatch ||  || align=right | 3.1 km || 
|-id=853 bgcolor=#E9E9E9
| 540853 ||  || — || April 8, 2006 || Kitt Peak || Spacewatch ||  || align=right | 2.3 km || 
|-id=854 bgcolor=#fefefe
| 540854 ||  || — || April 16, 2012 || Haleakala || Pan-STARRS ||  || align=right data-sort-value="0.86" | 860 m || 
|-id=855 bgcolor=#fefefe
| 540855 ||  || — || September 16, 2009 || Mount Lemmon || Mount Lemmon Survey ||  || align=right data-sort-value="0.88" | 880 m || 
|-id=856 bgcolor=#fefefe
| 540856 ||  || — || September 5, 2010 || Mount Lemmon || Mount Lemmon Survey ||  || align=right data-sort-value="0.80" | 800 m || 
|-id=857 bgcolor=#d6d6d6
| 540857 ||  || — || August 27, 2006 || Kitt Peak || Spacewatch ||  || align=right | 2.0 km || 
|-id=858 bgcolor=#E9E9E9
| 540858 ||  || — || September 23, 2008 || Kitt Peak || Spacewatch ||  || align=right | 1.1 km || 
|-id=859 bgcolor=#E9E9E9
| 540859 ||  || — || November 19, 2008 || Kitt Peak || Spacewatch ||  || align=right | 2.2 km || 
|-id=860 bgcolor=#d6d6d6
| 540860 ||  || — || January 18, 2009 || Mount Lemmon || Mount Lemmon Survey ||  || align=right | 1.9 km || 
|-id=861 bgcolor=#fefefe
| 540861 ||  || — || March 1, 2008 || Kitt Peak || Spacewatch ||  || align=right data-sort-value="0.82" | 820 m || 
|-id=862 bgcolor=#d6d6d6
| 540862 ||  || — || October 30, 2007 || Kitt Peak || Spacewatch ||  || align=right | 2.1 km || 
|-id=863 bgcolor=#d6d6d6
| 540863 ||  || — || September 30, 2006 || Mount Lemmon || Mount Lemmon Survey ||  || align=right | 3.0 km || 
|-id=864 bgcolor=#E9E9E9
| 540864 ||  || — || November 11, 2013 || Mount Lemmon || Mount Lemmon Survey ||  || align=right | 1.4 km || 
|-id=865 bgcolor=#E9E9E9
| 540865 ||  || — || September 10, 2007 || Mount Lemmon || Mount Lemmon Survey ||  || align=right | 1.9 km || 
|-id=866 bgcolor=#E9E9E9
| 540866 ||  || — || September 30, 2003 || Kitt Peak || Spacewatch ||  || align=right | 2.1 km || 
|-id=867 bgcolor=#d6d6d6
| 540867 ||  || — || September 27, 2011 || Mount Lemmon || Mount Lemmon Survey ||  || align=right | 3.1 km || 
|-id=868 bgcolor=#E9E9E9
| 540868 ||  || — || November 6, 2008 || Mount Lemmon || Mount Lemmon Survey ||  || align=right | 1.8 km || 
|-id=869 bgcolor=#fefefe
| 540869 ||  || — || November 10, 2010 || Mount Lemmon || Mount Lemmon Survey ||  || align=right data-sort-value="0.78" | 780 m || 
|-id=870 bgcolor=#d6d6d6
| 540870 ||  || — || February 26, 2014 || Haleakala || Pan-STARRS ||  || align=right | 2.0 km || 
|-id=871 bgcolor=#d6d6d6
| 540871 ||  || — || April 1, 2014 || Mount Lemmon || Mount Lemmon Survey ||  || align=right | 2.4 km || 
|-id=872 bgcolor=#E9E9E9
| 540872 ||  || — || September 26, 2008 || Kitt Peak || Spacewatch ||  || align=right | 1.4 km || 
|-id=873 bgcolor=#E9E9E9
| 540873 ||  || — || January 28, 2014 || Mount Lemmon || Mount Lemmon Survey ||  || align=right | 2.4 km || 
|-id=874 bgcolor=#d6d6d6
| 540874 ||  || — || December 18, 2007 || Kitt Peak || Spacewatch ||  || align=right | 2.2 km || 
|-id=875 bgcolor=#d6d6d6
| 540875 ||  || — || April 10, 2015 || Kitt Peak || Spacewatch ||  || align=right | 2.9 km || 
|-id=876 bgcolor=#d6d6d6
| 540876 ||  || — || February 9, 2008 || Kitt Peak || Spacewatch ||  || align=right | 2.1 km || 
|-id=877 bgcolor=#d6d6d6
| 540877 ||  || — || October 17, 2012 || Mount Lemmon || Mount Lemmon Survey ||  || align=right | 2.1 km || 
|-id=878 bgcolor=#d6d6d6
| 540878 ||  || — || November 4, 2012 || Mount Lemmon || Mount Lemmon Survey ||  || align=right | 1.7 km || 
|-id=879 bgcolor=#fefefe
| 540879 ||  || — || November 9, 1999 || Kitt Peak || Spacewatch ||  || align=right data-sort-value="0.51" | 510 m || 
|-id=880 bgcolor=#fefefe
| 540880 ||  || — || November 19, 2006 || Kitt Peak || Spacewatch ||  || align=right data-sort-value="0.75" | 750 m || 
|-id=881 bgcolor=#d6d6d6
| 540881 ||  || — || August 27, 2006 || Kitt Peak || Spacewatch ||  || align=right | 2.4 km || 
|-id=882 bgcolor=#d6d6d6
| 540882 ||  || — || October 18, 2007 || Mount Lemmon || Mount Lemmon Survey ||  || align=right | 1.8 km || 
|-id=883 bgcolor=#E9E9E9
| 540883 ||  || — || March 5, 2002 || Kitt Peak || Spacewatch ||  || align=right | 1.1 km || 
|-id=884 bgcolor=#E9E9E9
| 540884 ||  || — || April 14, 2007 || Mount Lemmon || Mount Lemmon Survey ||  || align=right data-sort-value="0.75" | 750 m || 
|-id=885 bgcolor=#fefefe
| 540885 ||  || — || November 16, 2009 || Mount Lemmon || Mount Lemmon Survey ||  || align=right data-sort-value="0.80" | 800 m || 
|-id=886 bgcolor=#d6d6d6
| 540886 ||  || — || March 2, 2009 || Mount Lemmon || Mount Lemmon Survey ||  || align=right | 2.9 km || 
|-id=887 bgcolor=#fefefe
| 540887 ||  || — || September 4, 1999 || Kitt Peak || Spacewatch ||  || align=right data-sort-value="0.70" | 700 m || 
|-id=888 bgcolor=#fefefe
| 540888 ||  || — || April 14, 2008 || Kitt Peak || Spacewatch ||  || align=right data-sort-value="0.75" | 750 m || 
|-id=889 bgcolor=#E9E9E9
| 540889 ||  || — || March 16, 2010 || Mount Lemmon || Mount Lemmon Survey ||  || align=right | 3.1 km || 
|-id=890 bgcolor=#d6d6d6
| 540890 ||  || — || December 3, 2012 || Mount Lemmon || Mount Lemmon Survey ||  || align=right | 2.3 km || 
|-id=891 bgcolor=#fefefe
| 540891 ||  || — || March 17, 2012 || Kitt Peak || Spacewatch ||  || align=right data-sort-value="0.75" | 750 m || 
|-id=892 bgcolor=#d6d6d6
| 540892 ||  || — || November 4, 2012 || Mount Lemmon || Mount Lemmon Survey ||  || align=right | 1.8 km || 
|-id=893 bgcolor=#E9E9E9
| 540893 ||  || — || February 22, 2001 || Kitt Peak || Spacewatch ||  || align=right | 1.1 km || 
|-id=894 bgcolor=#d6d6d6
| 540894 ||  || — || November 26, 2012 || Mount Lemmon || Mount Lemmon Survey ||  || align=right | 2.1 km || 
|-id=895 bgcolor=#d6d6d6
| 540895 ||  || — || February 13, 2013 || Haleakala || Pan-STARRS || 7:4 || align=right | 2.7 km || 
|-id=896 bgcolor=#E9E9E9
| 540896 ||  || — || November 22, 2008 || Kitt Peak || Spacewatch ||  || align=right | 1.8 km || 
|-id=897 bgcolor=#d6d6d6
| 540897 ||  || — || October 22, 2012 || Haleakala || Pan-STARRS ||  || align=right | 1.8 km || 
|-id=898 bgcolor=#E9E9E9
| 540898 ||  || — || October 21, 2008 || Mount Lemmon || Mount Lemmon Survey ||  || align=right | 1.6 km || 
|-id=899 bgcolor=#d6d6d6
| 540899 ||  || — || September 14, 2005 || Kitt Peak || Spacewatch ||  || align=right | 4.4 km || 
|-id=900 bgcolor=#d6d6d6
| 540900 ||  || — || January 13, 2008 || Kitt Peak || Spacewatch ||  || align=right | 2.9 km || 
|}

540901–541000 

|-bgcolor=#d6d6d6
| 540901 ||  || — || February 10, 2008 || Kitt Peak || Spacewatch ||  || align=right | 2.4 km || 
|-id=902 bgcolor=#d6d6d6
| 540902 ||  || — || September 30, 2011 || Kitt Peak || Spacewatch ||  || align=right | 2.8 km || 
|-id=903 bgcolor=#d6d6d6
| 540903 ||  || — || February 10, 2008 || Kitt Peak || Spacewatch ||  || align=right | 2.4 km || 
|-id=904 bgcolor=#d6d6d6
| 540904 ||  || — || January 18, 2009 || Kitt Peak || Spacewatch ||  || align=right | 2.4 km || 
|-id=905 bgcolor=#fefefe
| 540905 ||  || — || March 4, 2008 || Mount Lemmon || Mount Lemmon Survey ||  || align=right data-sort-value="0.94" | 940 m || 
|-id=906 bgcolor=#fefefe
| 540906 ||  || — || January 31, 2009 || Mount Lemmon || Mount Lemmon Survey ||  || align=right data-sort-value="0.61" | 610 m || 
|-id=907 bgcolor=#E9E9E9
| 540907 ||  || — || November 19, 2008 || Mount Lemmon || Mount Lemmon Survey ||  || align=right | 1.8 km || 
|-id=908 bgcolor=#d6d6d6
| 540908 ||  || — || December 3, 2012 || Mount Lemmon || Mount Lemmon Survey ||  || align=right | 2.7 km || 
|-id=909 bgcolor=#d6d6d6
| 540909 ||  || — || May 20, 2014 || Haleakala || Pan-STARRS ||  || align=right | 2.5 km || 
|-id=910 bgcolor=#d6d6d6
| 540910 ||  || — || September 27, 2006 || Kitt Peak || Spacewatch ||  || align=right | 2.6 km || 
|-id=911 bgcolor=#E9E9E9
| 540911 ||  || — || September 12, 2007 || Mount Lemmon || Mount Lemmon Survey ||  || align=right | 1.9 km || 
|-id=912 bgcolor=#E9E9E9
| 540912 ||  || — || October 11, 2004 || Kitt Peak || Spacewatch ||  || align=right | 1.5 km || 
|-id=913 bgcolor=#E9E9E9
| 540913 ||  || — || March 13, 2002 || Kitt Peak || Spacewatch ||  || align=right | 2.5 km || 
|-id=914 bgcolor=#E9E9E9
| 540914 ||  || — || September 4, 2008 || Kitt Peak || Spacewatch ||  || align=right | 1.4 km || 
|-id=915 bgcolor=#d6d6d6
| 540915 ||  || — || February 1, 2009 || Kitt Peak || Spacewatch ||  || align=right | 1.8 km || 
|-id=916 bgcolor=#E9E9E9
| 540916 ||  || — || November 27, 2009 || Kitt Peak || Spacewatch ||  || align=right | 1.1 km || 
|-id=917 bgcolor=#d6d6d6
| 540917 ||  || — || May 15, 2005 || Mount Lemmon || Mount Lemmon Survey ||  || align=right | 2.8 km || 
|-id=918 bgcolor=#fefefe
| 540918 ||  || — || January 4, 2012 || Mount Lemmon || Mount Lemmon Survey ||  || align=right data-sort-value="0.73" | 730 m || 
|-id=919 bgcolor=#fefefe
| 540919 ||  || — || March 28, 2012 || Mount Lemmon || Mount Lemmon Survey ||  || align=right data-sort-value="0.54" | 540 m || 
|-id=920 bgcolor=#E9E9E9
| 540920 ||  || — || October 22, 2008 || Kitt Peak || Spacewatch ||  || align=right | 1.4 km || 
|-id=921 bgcolor=#E9E9E9
| 540921 ||  || — || September 15, 2012 || Mount Lemmon || Mount Lemmon Survey ||  || align=right | 1.7 km || 
|-id=922 bgcolor=#d6d6d6
| 540922 ||  || — || December 22, 2012 || Haleakala || Pan-STARRS ||  || align=right | 2.5 km || 
|-id=923 bgcolor=#d6d6d6
| 540923 ||  || — || December 14, 2001 || Socorro || LINEAR ||  || align=right | 3.3 km || 
|-id=924 bgcolor=#E9E9E9
| 540924 ||  || — || April 20, 2006 || Kitt Peak || Spacewatch ||  || align=right | 2.0 km || 
|-id=925 bgcolor=#d6d6d6
| 540925 ||  || — || August 29, 2016 || Mount Lemmon || Mount Lemmon Survey ||  || align=right | 3.2 km || 
|-id=926 bgcolor=#E9E9E9
| 540926 ||  || — || December 2, 2005 || Kitt Peak || Spacewatch ||  || align=right | 1.2 km || 
|-id=927 bgcolor=#E9E9E9
| 540927 ||  || — || December 27, 2013 || Mount Lemmon || Mount Lemmon Survey ||  || align=right | 2.2 km || 
|-id=928 bgcolor=#E9E9E9
| 540928 ||  || — || October 27, 2008 || Kitt Peak || Spacewatch ||  || align=right | 1.8 km || 
|-id=929 bgcolor=#E9E9E9
| 540929 ||  || — || July 30, 2008 || Siding Spring || SSS ||  || align=right | 1.5 km || 
|-id=930 bgcolor=#d6d6d6
| 540930 ||  || — || February 12, 2004 || Kitt Peak || Spacewatch || 3:2 || align=right | 4.2 km || 
|-id=931 bgcolor=#E9E9E9
| 540931 ||  || — || September 24, 2008 || Catalina || CSS ||  || align=right | 1.9 km || 
|-id=932 bgcolor=#d6d6d6
| 540932 ||  || — || April 20, 2014 || Mount Lemmon || Mount Lemmon Survey ||  || align=right | 2.7 km || 
|-id=933 bgcolor=#E9E9E9
| 540933 ||  || — || November 28, 2013 || Mount Lemmon || Mount Lemmon Survey ||  || align=right data-sort-value="0.96" | 960 m || 
|-id=934 bgcolor=#E9E9E9
| 540934 ||  || — || November 19, 2008 || Kitt Peak || Spacewatch ||  || align=right | 1.2 km || 
|-id=935 bgcolor=#d6d6d6
| 540935 ||  || — || July 19, 2010 || WISE || WISE || 7:4 || align=right | 3.0 km || 
|-id=936 bgcolor=#d6d6d6
| 540936 ||  || — || January 5, 2013 || Mount Lemmon || Mount Lemmon Survey ||  || align=right | 2.3 km || 
|-id=937 bgcolor=#E9E9E9
| 540937 ||  || — || December 10, 2013 || Mount Lemmon || Mount Lemmon Survey ||  || align=right data-sort-value="0.67" | 670 m || 
|-id=938 bgcolor=#E9E9E9
| 540938 ||  || — || November 26, 2005 || Mount Lemmon || Mount Lemmon Survey ||  || align=right | 1.0 km || 
|-id=939 bgcolor=#d6d6d6
| 540939 ||  || — || May 8, 2013 || Haleakala || Pan-STARRS ||  || align=right | 2.2 km || 
|-id=940 bgcolor=#E9E9E9
| 540940 ||  || — || January 24, 2014 || Haleakala || Pan-STARRS ||  || align=right | 1.9 km || 
|-id=941 bgcolor=#E9E9E9
| 540941 ||  || — || May 24, 2015 || Haleakala || Pan-STARRS ||  || align=right | 1.0 km || 
|-id=942 bgcolor=#d6d6d6
| 540942 ||  || — || May 18, 2009 || Mount Lemmon || Mount Lemmon Survey ||  || align=right | 3.3 km || 
|-id=943 bgcolor=#E9E9E9
| 540943 ||  || — || September 22, 2003 || Kitt Peak || Spacewatch ||  || align=right | 1.9 km || 
|-id=944 bgcolor=#E9E9E9
| 540944 ||  || — || December 1, 2003 || Kitt Peak || Spacewatch ||  || align=right | 1.7 km || 
|-id=945 bgcolor=#E9E9E9
| 540945 ||  || — || February 7, 2006 || Mount Lemmon || Mount Lemmon Survey ||  || align=right | 1.1 km || 
|-id=946 bgcolor=#d6d6d6
| 540946 ||  || — || September 24, 2011 || Haleakala || Pan-STARRS ||  || align=right | 2.3 km || 
|-id=947 bgcolor=#d6d6d6
| 540947 ||  || — || August 28, 2005 || Kitt Peak || Spacewatch ||  || align=right | 2.9 km || 
|-id=948 bgcolor=#E9E9E9
| 540948 ||  || — || April 26, 2006 || Kitt Peak || Spacewatch ||  || align=right | 1.9 km || 
|-id=949 bgcolor=#E9E9E9
| 540949 ||  || — || November 2, 2013 || Mount Lemmon || Mount Lemmon Survey ||  || align=right | 1.00 km || 
|-id=950 bgcolor=#d6d6d6
| 540950 ||  || — || December 23, 2012 || Haleakala || Pan-STARRS ||  || align=right | 2.1 km || 
|-id=951 bgcolor=#d6d6d6
| 540951 ||  || — || February 26, 2014 || Haleakala || Pan-STARRS ||  || align=right | 2.1 km || 
|-id=952 bgcolor=#E9E9E9
| 540952 ||  || — || July 14, 2016 || Haleakala || Pan-STARRS ||  || align=right | 1.2 km || 
|-id=953 bgcolor=#E9E9E9
| 540953 ||  || — || November 10, 2004 || Kitt Peak || Spacewatch ||  || align=right | 1.5 km || 
|-id=954 bgcolor=#d6d6d6
| 540954 ||  || — || January 26, 2014 || Haleakala || Pan-STARRS ||  || align=right | 2.8 km || 
|-id=955 bgcolor=#fefefe
| 540955 ||  || — || June 10, 2005 || Kitt Peak || Spacewatch ||  || align=right data-sort-value="0.87" | 870 m || 
|-id=956 bgcolor=#d6d6d6
| 540956 ||  || — || November 19, 2006 || Kitt Peak || Spacewatch ||  || align=right | 2.6 km || 
|-id=957 bgcolor=#d6d6d6
| 540957 ||  || — || November 27, 2006 || Mount Lemmon || Mount Lemmon Survey ||  || align=right | 2.3 km || 
|-id=958 bgcolor=#d6d6d6
| 540958 ||  || — || March 10, 2014 || Mount Lemmon || Mount Lemmon Survey ||  || align=right | 2.6 km || 
|-id=959 bgcolor=#E9E9E9
| 540959 ||  || — || May 9, 2011 || Mount Lemmon || Mount Lemmon Survey ||  || align=right | 1.3 km || 
|-id=960 bgcolor=#d6d6d6
| 540960 ||  || — || March 12, 2014 || Mount Lemmon || Mount Lemmon Survey ||  || align=right | 2.3 km || 
|-id=961 bgcolor=#d6d6d6
| 540961 ||  || — || October 23, 2006 || Mount Lemmon || Mount Lemmon Survey ||  || align=right | 3.7 km || 
|-id=962 bgcolor=#E9E9E9
| 540962 ||  || — || April 27, 2011 || Haleakala || Pan-STARRS ||  || align=right | 1.7 km || 
|-id=963 bgcolor=#E9E9E9
| 540963 ||  || — || October 16, 2012 || Mount Lemmon || Mount Lemmon Survey ||  || align=right | 1.7 km || 
|-id=964 bgcolor=#fefefe
| 540964 ||  || — || September 14, 2013 || Haleakala || Pan-STARRS ||  || align=right data-sort-value="0.67" | 670 m || 
|-id=965 bgcolor=#E9E9E9
| 540965 ||  || — || October 28, 2008 || Mount Lemmon || Mount Lemmon Survey ||  || align=right | 1.4 km || 
|-id=966 bgcolor=#d6d6d6
| 540966 ||  || — || May 21, 2014 || Haleakala || Pan-STARRS ||  || align=right | 2.7 km || 
|-id=967 bgcolor=#E9E9E9
| 540967 ||  || — || November 27, 2013 || Haleakala || Pan-STARRS ||  || align=right data-sort-value="0.74" | 740 m || 
|-id=968 bgcolor=#fefefe
| 540968 ||  || — || December 31, 2007 || Kitt Peak || Spacewatch ||  || align=right data-sort-value="0.62" | 620 m || 
|-id=969 bgcolor=#d6d6d6
| 540969 ||  || — || August 3, 2016 || Haleakala || Pan-STARRS ||  || align=right | 1.8 km || 
|-id=970 bgcolor=#d6d6d6
| 540970 ||  || — || September 10, 2007 || Mount Lemmon || Mount Lemmon Survey ||  || align=right | 1.7 km || 
|-id=971 bgcolor=#E9E9E9
| 540971 ||  || — || May 30, 2011 || Haleakala || Pan-STARRS ||  || align=right | 2.4 km || 
|-id=972 bgcolor=#E9E9E9
| 540972 ||  || — || February 1, 2006 || Kitt Peak || Spacewatch ||  || align=right | 1.1 km || 
|-id=973 bgcolor=#fefefe
| 540973 ||  || — || January 30, 2011 || Haleakala || Pan-STARRS ||  || align=right data-sort-value="0.63" | 630 m || 
|-id=974 bgcolor=#fefefe
| 540974 ||  || — || November 9, 2007 || Kitt Peak || Spacewatch ||  || align=right data-sort-value="0.79" | 790 m || 
|-id=975 bgcolor=#E9E9E9
| 540975 ||  || — || August 24, 2008 || Kitt Peak || Spacewatch ||  || align=right | 1.3 km || 
|-id=976 bgcolor=#E9E9E9
| 540976 ||  || — || November 17, 1995 || Kitt Peak || Spacewatch ||  || align=right | 1.7 km || 
|-id=977 bgcolor=#E9E9E9
| 540977 ||  || — || November 1, 2013 || Mount Lemmon || Mount Lemmon Survey ||  || align=right | 2.0 km || 
|-id=978 bgcolor=#E9E9E9
| 540978 ||  || — || August 30, 2003 || Kitt Peak || Spacewatch ||  || align=right | 1.7 km || 
|-id=979 bgcolor=#E9E9E9
| 540979 ||  || — || November 21, 2009 || Kitt Peak || Spacewatch ||  || align=right data-sort-value="0.90" | 900 m || 
|-id=980 bgcolor=#d6d6d6
| 540980 ||  || — || October 15, 2007 || Kitt Peak || Spacewatch ||  || align=right | 2.2 km || 
|-id=981 bgcolor=#fefefe
| 540981 ||  || — || September 1, 2005 || Kitt Peak || Spacewatch ||  || align=right data-sort-value="0.60" | 600 m || 
|-id=982 bgcolor=#d6d6d6
| 540982 ||  || — || June 29, 2016 || Haleakala || Pan-STARRS ||  || align=right | 2.7 km || 
|-id=983 bgcolor=#d6d6d6
| 540983 ||  || — || September 15, 2006 || Kitt Peak || Spacewatch ||  || align=right | 2.3 km || 
|-id=984 bgcolor=#E9E9E9
| 540984 ||  || — || November 5, 1999 || Kitt Peak || Spacewatch ||  || align=right | 2.6 km || 
|-id=985 bgcolor=#fefefe
| 540985 ||  || — || August 31, 2005 || Kitt Peak || Spacewatch ||  || align=right | 1.0 km || 
|-id=986 bgcolor=#fefefe
| 540986 ||  || — || November 12, 2001 || Kitt Peak || Spacewatch ||  || align=right data-sort-value="0.70" | 700 m || 
|-id=987 bgcolor=#d6d6d6
| 540987 ||  || — || November 23, 2012 || Kitt Peak || Spacewatch ||  || align=right | 2.3 km || 
|-id=988 bgcolor=#d6d6d6
| 540988 ||  || — || March 24, 2014 || Haleakala || Pan-STARRS ||  || align=right | 2.1 km || 
|-id=989 bgcolor=#d6d6d6
| 540989 ||  || — || October 31, 2006 || Mount Lemmon || Mount Lemmon Survey ||  || align=right | 2.7 km || 
|-id=990 bgcolor=#E9E9E9
| 540990 ||  || — || August 9, 2004 || Anderson Mesa || LONEOS ||  || align=right data-sort-value="0.92" | 920 m || 
|-id=991 bgcolor=#d6d6d6
| 540991 ||  || — || September 26, 2006 || Kitt Peak || Spacewatch ||  || align=right | 2.2 km || 
|-id=992 bgcolor=#E9E9E9
| 540992 ||  || — || December 31, 2013 || Mount Lemmon || Mount Lemmon Survey ||  || align=right | 1.2 km || 
|-id=993 bgcolor=#d6d6d6
| 540993 ||  || — || May 4, 2009 || Mount Lemmon || Mount Lemmon Survey ||  || align=right | 2.6 km || 
|-id=994 bgcolor=#E9E9E9
| 540994 ||  || — || November 10, 2005 || Kitt Peak || Spacewatch ||  || align=right data-sort-value="0.96" | 960 m || 
|-id=995 bgcolor=#fefefe
| 540995 ||  || — || January 22, 2015 || Haleakala || Pan-STARRS ||  || align=right data-sort-value="0.68" | 680 m || 
|-id=996 bgcolor=#E9E9E9
| 540996 ||  || — || June 2, 2011 || Haleakala || Pan-STARRS ||  || align=right | 1.5 km || 
|-id=997 bgcolor=#d6d6d6
| 540997 ||  || — || December 22, 2008 || Kitt Peak || Spacewatch ||  || align=right | 2.0 km || 
|-id=998 bgcolor=#fefefe
| 540998 ||  || — || July 10, 2005 || Kitt Peak || Spacewatch ||  || align=right data-sort-value="0.73" | 730 m || 
|-id=999 bgcolor=#E9E9E9
| 540999 ||  || — || January 23, 2015 || Haleakala || Pan-STARRS ||  || align=right data-sort-value="0.72" | 720 m || 
|-id=000 bgcolor=#d6d6d6
| 541000 ||  || — || April 23, 2010 || WISE || WISE ||  || align=right | 2.6 km || 
|}

References

External links 
 Discovery Circumstances: Numbered Minor Planets (540001)–(545000) (IAU Minor Planet Center)

0540